

434001–434100 

|-bgcolor=#d6d6d6
| 434001 ||  || — || September 28, 2000 || Socorro || LINEAR || — || align=right | 4.2 km || 
|-id=002 bgcolor=#E9E9E9
| 434002 ||  || — || September 29, 2000 || Kitt Peak || Spacewatch || — || align=right | 1.9 km || 
|-id=003 bgcolor=#fefefe
| 434003 ||  || — || September 26, 2000 || Apache Point || SDSS || — || align=right data-sort-value="0.68" | 680 m || 
|-id=004 bgcolor=#d6d6d6
| 434004 ||  || — || September 26, 2000 || Apache Point || SDSS || EOS || align=right | 1.9 km || 
|-id=005 bgcolor=#d6d6d6
| 434005 ||  || — || October 4, 2000 || Socorro || LINEAR || — || align=right | 4.7 km || 
|-id=006 bgcolor=#E9E9E9
| 434006 ||  || — || October 24, 2000 || Socorro || LINEAR || — || align=right | 1.3 km || 
|-id=007 bgcolor=#FFC2E0
| 434007 ||  || — || November 1, 2000 || Kitt Peak || Spacewatch || AMOcritical || align=right data-sort-value="0.74" | 740 m || 
|-id=008 bgcolor=#fefefe
| 434008 ||  || — || November 19, 2000 || Socorro || LINEAR || H || align=right | 1.1 km || 
|-id=009 bgcolor=#d6d6d6
| 434009 ||  || — || November 17, 2000 || Kitt Peak || Spacewatch || 3:2 || align=right | 7.5 km || 
|-id=010 bgcolor=#E9E9E9
| 434010 ||  || — || December 4, 2000 || Bohyunsan || Y.-B. Jeon, B.-C. Lee || — || align=right data-sort-value="0.94" | 940 m || 
|-id=011 bgcolor=#E9E9E9
| 434011 ||  || — || December 19, 2000 || Kitt Peak || DLS || — || align=right | 1.9 km || 
|-id=012 bgcolor=#fefefe
| 434012 ||  || — || March 28, 2001 || Kitt Peak || Spacewatch || — || align=right data-sort-value="0.78" | 780 m || 
|-id=013 bgcolor=#FA8072
| 434013 ||  || — || August 10, 2001 || Palomar || NEAT || — || align=right data-sort-value="0.76" | 760 m || 
|-id=014 bgcolor=#E9E9E9
| 434014 ||  || — || August 18, 2001 || Anderson Mesa || LONEOS || (194) || align=right | 1.3 km || 
|-id=015 bgcolor=#fefefe
| 434015 ||  || — || August 24, 2001 || Haleakala || NEAT || V || align=right data-sort-value="0.79" | 790 m || 
|-id=016 bgcolor=#fefefe
| 434016 ||  || — || August 25, 2001 || Socorro || LINEAR || — || align=right | 1.0 km || 
|-id=017 bgcolor=#fefefe
| 434017 ||  || — || August 23, 2001 || Anderson Mesa || LONEOS || NYS || align=right data-sort-value="0.74" | 740 m || 
|-id=018 bgcolor=#fefefe
| 434018 ||  || — || August 27, 2001 || Anderson Mesa || LONEOS || NYS || align=right data-sort-value="0.65" | 650 m || 
|-id=019 bgcolor=#FA8072
| 434019 ||  || — || September 8, 2001 || Socorro || LINEAR || — || align=right data-sort-value="0.74" | 740 m || 
|-id=020 bgcolor=#fefefe
| 434020 ||  || — || September 10, 2001 || Socorro || LINEAR || H || align=right data-sort-value="0.72" | 720 m || 
|-id=021 bgcolor=#E9E9E9
| 434021 ||  || — || September 16, 2001 || Socorro || LINEAR || — || align=right | 1.8 km || 
|-id=022 bgcolor=#fefefe
| 434022 ||  || — || September 12, 2001 || Kitt Peak || Spacewatch || — || align=right data-sort-value="0.82" | 820 m || 
|-id=023 bgcolor=#d6d6d6
| 434023 ||  || — || September 16, 2001 || Socorro || LINEAR || — || align=right | 3.6 km || 
|-id=024 bgcolor=#fefefe
| 434024 ||  || — || September 16, 2001 || Socorro || LINEAR || — || align=right data-sort-value="0.84" | 840 m || 
|-id=025 bgcolor=#fefefe
| 434025 ||  || — || September 16, 2001 || Socorro || LINEAR || — || align=right | 1.1 km || 
|-id=026 bgcolor=#fefefe
| 434026 ||  || — || September 16, 2001 || Socorro || LINEAR || — || align=right data-sort-value="0.90" | 900 m || 
|-id=027 bgcolor=#d6d6d6
| 434027 ||  || — || September 16, 2001 || Socorro || LINEAR || — || align=right | 2.9 km || 
|-id=028 bgcolor=#E9E9E9
| 434028 ||  || — || September 19, 2001 || Socorro || LINEAR || — || align=right data-sort-value="0.98" | 980 m || 
|-id=029 bgcolor=#fefefe
| 434029 ||  || — || September 19, 2001 || Socorro || LINEAR || critical || align=right data-sort-value="0.82" | 820 m || 
|-id=030 bgcolor=#fefefe
| 434030 ||  || — || September 19, 2001 || Socorro || LINEAR || — || align=right data-sort-value="0.75" | 750 m || 
|-id=031 bgcolor=#fefefe
| 434031 ||  || — || August 25, 2001 || Kitt Peak || Spacewatch || — || align=right data-sort-value="0.75" | 750 m || 
|-id=032 bgcolor=#d6d6d6
| 434032 ||  || — || September 19, 2001 || Socorro || LINEAR || — || align=right | 3.5 km || 
|-id=033 bgcolor=#d6d6d6
| 434033 ||  || — || September 19, 2001 || Socorro || LINEAR || — || align=right | 2.9 km || 
|-id=034 bgcolor=#d6d6d6
| 434034 ||  || — || September 19, 2001 || Socorro || LINEAR || — || align=right | 2.8 km || 
|-id=035 bgcolor=#fefefe
| 434035 ||  || — || October 9, 1997 || Kitt Peak || Spacewatch || — || align=right data-sort-value="0.94" | 940 m || 
|-id=036 bgcolor=#E9E9E9
| 434036 ||  || — || September 19, 2001 || Socorro || LINEAR || (5) || align=right data-sort-value="0.70" | 700 m || 
|-id=037 bgcolor=#d6d6d6
| 434037 ||  || — || September 19, 2001 || Socorro || LINEAR || — || align=right | 3.1 km || 
|-id=038 bgcolor=#d6d6d6
| 434038 ||  || — || September 19, 2001 || Socorro || LINEAR || — || align=right | 3.0 km || 
|-id=039 bgcolor=#d6d6d6
| 434039 ||  || — || September 12, 2001 || Kitt Peak || Spacewatch || — || align=right | 2.7 km || 
|-id=040 bgcolor=#fefefe
| 434040 ||  || — || September 19, 2001 || Kitt Peak || Spacewatch || MAS || align=right data-sort-value="0.66" | 660 m || 
|-id=041 bgcolor=#fefefe
| 434041 ||  || — || September 19, 2001 || Socorro || LINEAR || NYS || align=right data-sort-value="0.68" | 680 m || 
|-id=042 bgcolor=#d6d6d6
| 434042 ||  || — || October 14, 2001 || Socorro || LINEAR || — || align=right | 3.4 km || 
|-id=043 bgcolor=#fefefe
| 434043 ||  || — || October 13, 2001 || Socorro || LINEAR || NYS || align=right data-sort-value="0.81" | 810 m || 
|-id=044 bgcolor=#fefefe
| 434044 ||  || — || October 14, 2001 || Socorro || LINEAR || — || align=right | 1.1 km || 
|-id=045 bgcolor=#fefefe
| 434045 ||  || — || September 20, 2001 || Socorro || LINEAR || — || align=right data-sort-value="0.97" | 970 m || 
|-id=046 bgcolor=#E9E9E9
| 434046 ||  || — || October 14, 2001 || Socorro || LINEAR || — || align=right | 1.5 km || 
|-id=047 bgcolor=#fefefe
| 434047 ||  || — || October 13, 2001 || Palomar || NEAT || — || align=right data-sort-value="0.89" | 890 m || 
|-id=048 bgcolor=#d6d6d6
| 434048 ||  || — || October 15, 2001 || Kitt Peak || Spacewatch || — || align=right | 2.8 km || 
|-id=049 bgcolor=#d6d6d6
| 434049 ||  || — || October 9, 2001 || Kitt Peak || Spacewatch || — || align=right | 3.1 km || 
|-id=050 bgcolor=#fefefe
| 434050 ||  || — || October 10, 2001 || Palomar || NEAT || — || align=right data-sort-value="0.90" | 900 m || 
|-id=051 bgcolor=#FFC2E0
| 434051 ||  || — || October 24, 2001 || Palomar || NEAT || AMO || align=right data-sort-value="0.46" | 460 m || 
|-id=052 bgcolor=#FA8072
| 434052 ||  || — || October 24, 2001 || Socorro || LINEAR || — || align=right | 1.0 km || 
|-id=053 bgcolor=#FFC2E0
| 434053 ||  || — || October 28, 2001 || Palomar || NEAT || AMO || align=right data-sort-value="0.28" | 280 m || 
|-id=054 bgcolor=#fefefe
| 434054 ||  || — || October 17, 2001 || Socorro || LINEAR || — || align=right | 1.6 km || 
|-id=055 bgcolor=#d6d6d6
| 434055 ||  || — || October 17, 2001 || Socorro || LINEAR || — || align=right | 3.7 km || 
|-id=056 bgcolor=#d6d6d6
| 434056 ||  || — || October 20, 2001 || Socorro || LINEAR || — || align=right | 2.4 km || 
|-id=057 bgcolor=#fefefe
| 434057 ||  || — || October 23, 2001 || Socorro || LINEAR || — || align=right | 1.1 km || 
|-id=058 bgcolor=#d6d6d6
| 434058 ||  || — || October 23, 2001 || Socorro || LINEAR || Tj (2.99) || align=right | 3.3 km || 
|-id=059 bgcolor=#d6d6d6
| 434059 ||  || — || October 21, 2001 || Socorro || LINEAR || EOS || align=right | 2.1 km || 
|-id=060 bgcolor=#fefefe
| 434060 ||  || — || October 18, 2001 || Palomar || NEAT || MAS || align=right data-sort-value="0.71" | 710 m || 
|-id=061 bgcolor=#fefefe
| 434061 ||  || — || October 23, 2001 || Socorro || LINEAR || — || align=right | 1.1 km || 
|-id=062 bgcolor=#fefefe
| 434062 ||  || — || November 9, 2001 || Socorro || LINEAR || H || align=right data-sort-value="0.62" | 620 m || 
|-id=063 bgcolor=#fefefe
| 434063 ||  || — || November 10, 2001 || Socorro || LINEAR || — || align=right | 1.0 km || 
|-id=064 bgcolor=#d6d6d6
| 434064 ||  || — || November 12, 2001 || Emerald Lane || L. Ball || — || align=right | 2.7 km || 
|-id=065 bgcolor=#d6d6d6
| 434065 ||  || — || November 17, 2001 || Socorro || LINEAR || — || align=right | 3.4 km || 
|-id=066 bgcolor=#fefefe
| 434066 ||  || — || November 19, 2001 || Socorro || LINEAR || MAS || align=right data-sort-value="0.84" | 840 m || 
|-id=067 bgcolor=#d6d6d6
| 434067 ||  || — || November 19, 2001 || Socorro || LINEAR || EOS || align=right | 2.0 km || 
|-id=068 bgcolor=#d6d6d6
| 434068 ||  || — || November 9, 2001 || Socorro || LINEAR || — || align=right | 3.9 km || 
|-id=069 bgcolor=#d6d6d6
| 434069 ||  || — || November 20, 2001 || Socorro || LINEAR || — || align=right | 2.7 km || 
|-id=070 bgcolor=#d6d6d6
| 434070 ||  || — || December 5, 2001 || Haleakala || NEAT || — || align=right | 4.1 km || 
|-id=071 bgcolor=#d6d6d6
| 434071 ||  || — || December 14, 2001 || Socorro || LINEAR || — || align=right | 3.5 km || 
|-id=072 bgcolor=#E9E9E9
| 434072 ||  || — || December 14, 2001 || Socorro || LINEAR || — || align=right | 1.1 km || 
|-id=073 bgcolor=#E9E9E9
| 434073 ||  || — || December 14, 2001 || Kitt Peak || Spacewatch || — || align=right | 1.5 km || 
|-id=074 bgcolor=#d6d6d6
| 434074 ||  || — || November 17, 2001 || Socorro || LINEAR || — || align=right | 3.6 km || 
|-id=075 bgcolor=#d6d6d6
| 434075 ||  || — || November 19, 2001 || Socorro || LINEAR || — || align=right | 3.6 km || 
|-id=076 bgcolor=#E9E9E9
| 434076 ||  || — || December 14, 2001 || Socorro || LINEAR || — || align=right | 1.2 km || 
|-id=077 bgcolor=#E9E9E9
| 434077 ||  || — || December 18, 2001 || Socorro || LINEAR || — || align=right | 1.4 km || 
|-id=078 bgcolor=#d6d6d6
| 434078 ||  || — || December 17, 2001 || Socorro || LINEAR || — || align=right | 3.7 km || 
|-id=079 bgcolor=#E9E9E9
| 434079 ||  || — || December 19, 2001 || Anderson Mesa || LONEOS || — || align=right | 1.6 km || 
|-id=080 bgcolor=#FA8072
| 434080 ||  || — || January 7, 2002 || Haleakala || NEAT || — || align=right | 1.8 km || 
|-id=081 bgcolor=#E9E9E9
| 434081 ||  || — || January 13, 2002 || Socorro || LINEAR || (5) || align=right data-sort-value="0.98" | 980 m || 
|-id=082 bgcolor=#fefefe
| 434082 ||  || — || January 19, 2002 || Anderson Mesa || LONEOS || H || align=right data-sort-value="0.82" | 820 m || 
|-id=083 bgcolor=#E9E9E9
| 434083 ||  || — || February 6, 2002 || Socorro || LINEAR || — || align=right | 1.4 km || 
|-id=084 bgcolor=#FA8072
| 434084 ||  || — || February 6, 2002 || Siding Spring || R. H. McNaught || — || align=right | 1.1 km || 
|-id=085 bgcolor=#E9E9E9
| 434085 ||  || — || February 6, 2002 || Socorro || LINEAR || — || align=right | 1.2 km || 
|-id=086 bgcolor=#E9E9E9
| 434086 ||  || — || February 13, 2002 || Socorro || LINEAR || — || align=right | 3.0 km || 
|-id=087 bgcolor=#E9E9E9
| 434087 ||  || — || February 7, 2002 || Socorro || LINEAR || — || align=right | 1.1 km || 
|-id=088 bgcolor=#E9E9E9
| 434088 ||  || — || February 7, 2002 || Socorro || LINEAR || — || align=right | 2.1 km || 
|-id=089 bgcolor=#E9E9E9
| 434089 ||  || — || February 8, 2002 || Socorro || LINEAR || — || align=right | 1.7 km || 
|-id=090 bgcolor=#E9E9E9
| 434090 ||  || — || February 10, 2002 || Socorro || LINEAR || — || align=right | 1.9 km || 
|-id=091 bgcolor=#E9E9E9
| 434091 ||  || — || February 6, 2002 || Kitt Peak || M. W. Buie || — || align=right data-sort-value="0.74" | 740 m || 
|-id=092 bgcolor=#E9E9E9
| 434092 ||  || — || March 13, 2002 || Palomar || NEAT || — || align=right | 1.8 km || 
|-id=093 bgcolor=#E9E9E9
| 434093 ||  || — || March 9, 2002 || Kitt Peak || Spacewatch || — || align=right data-sort-value="0.84" | 840 m || 
|-id=094 bgcolor=#E9E9E9
| 434094 ||  || — || March 13, 2002 || Socorro || LINEAR || — || align=right | 1.6 km || 
|-id=095 bgcolor=#E9E9E9
| 434095 ||  || — || March 19, 2002 || Palomar || NEAT || — || align=right | 1.2 km || 
|-id=096 bgcolor=#FFC2E0
| 434096 ||  || — || April 11, 2002 || Socorro || LINEAR || APO +1kmPHA || align=right data-sort-value="0.53" | 530 m || 
|-id=097 bgcolor=#E9E9E9
| 434097 ||  || — || April 1, 2002 || Palomar || NEAT || — || align=right | 2.2 km || 
|-id=098 bgcolor=#E9E9E9
| 434098 ||  || — || April 9, 2002 || Kitt Peak || Spacewatch || — || align=right | 1.6 km || 
|-id=099 bgcolor=#fefefe
| 434099 ||  || — || April 8, 2002 || Palomar || NEAT || H || align=right data-sort-value="0.56" | 560 m || 
|-id=100 bgcolor=#E9E9E9
| 434100 ||  || — || April 12, 2002 || Palomar || NEAT || — || align=right | 1.4 km || 
|}

434101–434200 

|-bgcolor=#fefefe
| 434101 ||  || — || May 7, 2002 || Palomar || NEAT || — || align=right data-sort-value="0.94" | 940 m || 
|-id=102 bgcolor=#fefefe
| 434102 ||  || — || May 15, 2002 || Palomar || NEAT || H || align=right data-sort-value="0.81" | 810 m || 
|-id=103 bgcolor=#E9E9E9
| 434103 ||  || — || May 4, 2002 || Anderson Mesa || LONEOS || — || align=right | 1.6 km || 
|-id=104 bgcolor=#E9E9E9
| 434104 ||  || — || June 5, 2002 || Palomar || NEAT || — || align=right | 1.9 km || 
|-id=105 bgcolor=#fefefe
| 434105 ||  || — || July 5, 2002 || Kitt Peak || Spacewatch || H || align=right data-sort-value="0.82" | 820 m || 
|-id=106 bgcolor=#E9E9E9
| 434106 ||  || — || July 12, 2002 || Palomar || NEAT || — || align=right | 1.8 km || 
|-id=107 bgcolor=#E9E9E9
| 434107 ||  || — || July 9, 2002 || Palomar || NEAT || — || align=right | 2.0 km || 
|-id=108 bgcolor=#fefefe
| 434108 ||  || — || July 15, 2002 || Palomar || NEAT || — || align=right data-sort-value="0.68" | 680 m || 
|-id=109 bgcolor=#E9E9E9
| 434109 ||  || — || July 18, 2002 || Socorro || LINEAR || JUN || align=right data-sort-value="0.99" | 990 m || 
|-id=110 bgcolor=#FA8072
| 434110 ||  || — || July 31, 2002 || Socorro || LINEAR || — || align=right | 3.3 km || 
|-id=111 bgcolor=#fefefe
| 434111 ||  || — || July 18, 2002 || Palomar || NEAT || — || align=right data-sort-value="0.49" | 490 m || 
|-id=112 bgcolor=#E9E9E9
| 434112 ||  || — || August 4, 2002 || Palomar || NEAT || DOR || align=right | 2.6 km || 
|-id=113 bgcolor=#FA8072
| 434113 ||  || — || August 11, 2002 || Socorro || LINEAR || — || align=right | 1.0 km || 
|-id=114 bgcolor=#E9E9E9
| 434114 ||  || — || August 12, 2002 || Socorro || LINEAR || — || align=right | 3.4 km || 
|-id=115 bgcolor=#E9E9E9
| 434115 ||  || — || August 12, 2002 || Socorro || LINEAR || — || align=right | 2.3 km || 
|-id=116 bgcolor=#E9E9E9
| 434116 ||  || — || August 12, 2002 || Socorro || LINEAR || — || align=right | 2.2 km || 
|-id=117 bgcolor=#E9E9E9
| 434117 ||  || — || August 14, 2002 || Socorro || LINEAR || — || align=right | 2.4 km || 
|-id=118 bgcolor=#fefefe
| 434118 ||  || — || August 8, 2002 || Palomar || A. Lowe || — || align=right data-sort-value="0.52" | 520 m || 
|-id=119 bgcolor=#d6d6d6
| 434119 ||  || — || October 15, 1995 || Kitt Peak || Spacewatch || 3:2 || align=right | 4.2 km || 
|-id=120 bgcolor=#E9E9E9
| 434120 ||  || — || August 15, 2002 || Palomar || NEAT || — || align=right | 2.0 km || 
|-id=121 bgcolor=#E9E9E9
| 434121 ||  || — || August 8, 2002 || Palomar || NEAT || — || align=right | 1.8 km || 
|-id=122 bgcolor=#fefefe
| 434122 ||  || — || August 20, 2002 || Kvistaberg || UDAS || — || align=right | 1.3 km || 
|-id=123 bgcolor=#fefefe
| 434123 ||  || — || August 30, 2002 || Kitt Peak || Spacewatch || — || align=right data-sort-value="0.69" | 690 m || 
|-id=124 bgcolor=#E9E9E9
| 434124 ||  || — || August 29, 2002 || Palomar || S. F. Hönig || — || align=right | 2.2 km || 
|-id=125 bgcolor=#fefefe
| 434125 ||  || — || August 29, 2002 || Palomar || S. F. Hönig || — || align=right data-sort-value="0.75" | 750 m || 
|-id=126 bgcolor=#fefefe
| 434126 ||  || — || August 16, 2002 || Palomar || A. Lowe || H || align=right data-sort-value="0.72" | 720 m || 
|-id=127 bgcolor=#fefefe
| 434127 ||  || — || August 29, 2002 || Palomar || S. F. Hönig || — || align=right data-sort-value="0.93" | 930 m || 
|-id=128 bgcolor=#fefefe
| 434128 ||  || — || August 19, 2002 || Palomar || NEAT || — || align=right data-sort-value="0.80" | 800 m || 
|-id=129 bgcolor=#E9E9E9
| 434129 ||  || — || August 17, 2002 || Palomar || NEAT || — || align=right | 2.3 km || 
|-id=130 bgcolor=#E9E9E9
| 434130 ||  || — || August 30, 2002 || Palomar || NEAT || — || align=right | 1.8 km || 
|-id=131 bgcolor=#E9E9E9
| 434131 ||  || — || August 30, 2002 || Palomar || NEAT || — || align=right | 2.4 km || 
|-id=132 bgcolor=#E9E9E9
| 434132 ||  || — || August 18, 2002 || Palomar || NEAT || — || align=right | 1.9 km || 
|-id=133 bgcolor=#E9E9E9
| 434133 ||  || — || August 28, 2002 || Palomar || Palomar Obs. || — || align=right | 2.1 km || 
|-id=134 bgcolor=#E9E9E9
| 434134 ||  || — || August 17, 2002 || Palomar || NEAT || DOR || align=right | 2.3 km || 
|-id=135 bgcolor=#E9E9E9
| 434135 ||  || — || August 16, 2002 || Palomar || NEAT || — || align=right | 1.7 km || 
|-id=136 bgcolor=#fefefe
| 434136 ||  || — || August 30, 2002 || Palomar || NEAT || — || align=right data-sort-value="0.62" | 620 m || 
|-id=137 bgcolor=#fefefe
| 434137 ||  || — || August 17, 2002 || Palomar || NEAT || BAP || align=right data-sort-value="0.80" | 800 m || 
|-id=138 bgcolor=#E9E9E9
| 434138 ||  || — || August 12, 2002 || Socorro || LINEAR || — || align=right | 2.0 km || 
|-id=139 bgcolor=#fefefe
| 434139 ||  || — || September 3, 2002 || Needville || Needville Obs. || — || align=right data-sort-value="0.71" | 710 m || 
|-id=140 bgcolor=#fefefe
| 434140 ||  || — || September 5, 2002 || Socorro || LINEAR || — || align=right data-sort-value="0.84" | 840 m || 
|-id=141 bgcolor=#E9E9E9
| 434141 ||  || — || September 5, 2002 || Anderson Mesa || LONEOS || — || align=right | 1.7 km || 
|-id=142 bgcolor=#fefefe
| 434142 ||  || — || September 5, 2002 || Socorro || LINEAR || — || align=right data-sort-value="0.68" | 680 m || 
|-id=143 bgcolor=#fefefe
| 434143 ||  || — || September 5, 2002 || Socorro || LINEAR || — || align=right data-sort-value="0.79" | 790 m || 
|-id=144 bgcolor=#d6d6d6
| 434144 ||  || — || September 5, 2002 || Socorro || LINEAR || — || align=right | 2.9 km || 
|-id=145 bgcolor=#fefefe
| 434145 ||  || — || September 12, 2002 || Palomar || NEAT || — || align=right | 1.0 km || 
|-id=146 bgcolor=#d6d6d6
| 434146 ||  || — || September 12, 2002 || Palomar || NEAT || — || align=right | 3.5 km || 
|-id=147 bgcolor=#FA8072
| 434147 ||  || — || September 11, 2002 || Palomar || NEAT || — || align=right data-sort-value="0.64" | 640 m || 
|-id=148 bgcolor=#E9E9E9
| 434148 ||  || — || September 13, 2002 || Palomar || NEAT || — || align=right | 2.4 km || 
|-id=149 bgcolor=#E9E9E9
| 434149 ||  || — || September 14, 2002 || Kitt Peak || Spacewatch || — || align=right | 1.9 km || 
|-id=150 bgcolor=#fefefe
| 434150 ||  || — || September 13, 2002 || Palomar || NEAT || — || align=right data-sort-value="0.71" | 710 m || 
|-id=151 bgcolor=#fefefe
| 434151 ||  || — || September 13, 2002 || Palomar || NEAT || V || align=right data-sort-value="0.78" | 780 m || 
|-id=152 bgcolor=#fefefe
| 434152 ||  || — || September 14, 2002 || Palomar || NEAT || (2076) || align=right data-sort-value="0.94" | 940 m || 
|-id=153 bgcolor=#E9E9E9
| 434153 ||  || — || September 14, 2002 || Palomar || NEAT || AEO || align=right | 1.2 km || 
|-id=154 bgcolor=#FFC2E0
| 434154 ||  || — || September 16, 2002 || Haleakala || NEAT || AMOcritical || align=right data-sort-value="0.39" | 390 m || 
|-id=155 bgcolor=#d6d6d6
| 434155 ||  || — || September 27, 2002 || Palomar || NEAT || — || align=right | 2.4 km || 
|-id=156 bgcolor=#E9E9E9
| 434156 ||  || — || September 27, 2002 || Palomar || NEAT || — || align=right | 3.0 km || 
|-id=157 bgcolor=#fefefe
| 434157 ||  || — || September 26, 2002 || Palomar || NEAT || — || align=right data-sort-value="0.71" | 710 m || 
|-id=158 bgcolor=#fefefe
| 434158 ||  || — || September 16, 2002 || Palomar || NEAT || — || align=right data-sort-value="0.84" | 840 m || 
|-id=159 bgcolor=#fefefe
| 434159 ||  || — || September 26, 2002 || Palomar || NEAT || — || align=right data-sort-value="0.58" | 580 m || 
|-id=160 bgcolor=#fefefe
| 434160 ||  || — || October 1, 2002 || Anderson Mesa || LONEOS || (2076) || align=right data-sort-value="0.74" | 740 m || 
|-id=161 bgcolor=#d6d6d6
| 434161 ||  || — || October 1, 2002 || Anderson Mesa || LONEOS || — || align=right | 2.7 km || 
|-id=162 bgcolor=#d6d6d6
| 434162 ||  || — || October 2, 2002 || Socorro || LINEAR || — || align=right | 2.9 km || 
|-id=163 bgcolor=#fefefe
| 434163 ||  || — || October 2, 2002 || Socorro || LINEAR || — || align=right data-sort-value="0.90" | 900 m || 
|-id=164 bgcolor=#fefefe
| 434164 ||  || — || October 2, 2002 || Socorro || LINEAR || — || align=right data-sort-value="0.95" | 950 m || 
|-id=165 bgcolor=#FA8072
| 434165 ||  || — || October 2, 2002 || Socorro || LINEAR || — || align=right data-sort-value="0.87" | 870 m || 
|-id=166 bgcolor=#fefefe
| 434166 ||  || — || October 4, 2002 || Campo Imperatore || CINEOS || — || align=right data-sort-value="0.84" | 840 m || 
|-id=167 bgcolor=#FA8072
| 434167 ||  || — || October 5, 2002 || Socorro || LINEAR || Tj (2.87) || align=right | 4.3 km || 
|-id=168 bgcolor=#fefefe
| 434168 ||  || — || October 1, 2002 || Anderson Mesa || LONEOS || — || align=right | 1.2 km || 
|-id=169 bgcolor=#fefefe
| 434169 ||  || — || October 3, 2002 || Socorro || LINEAR || — || align=right data-sort-value="0.71" | 710 m || 
|-id=170 bgcolor=#d6d6d6
| 434170 ||  || — || October 4, 2002 || Palomar || NEAT || — || align=right | 2.9 km || 
|-id=171 bgcolor=#fefefe
| 434171 ||  || — || October 4, 2002 || Palomar || NEAT || — || align=right | 1.2 km || 
|-id=172 bgcolor=#fefefe
| 434172 ||  || — || October 5, 2002 || Palomar || NEAT || — || align=right | 1.2 km || 
|-id=173 bgcolor=#E9E9E9
| 434173 ||  || — || October 3, 2002 || Palomar || NEAT || — || align=right | 2.9 km || 
|-id=174 bgcolor=#d6d6d6
| 434174 ||  || — || October 5, 2002 || Apache Point || SDSS || — || align=right | 2.3 km || 
|-id=175 bgcolor=#fefefe
| 434175 ||  || — || October 10, 2002 || Apache Point || SDSS || V || align=right data-sort-value="0.53" | 530 m || 
|-id=176 bgcolor=#FA8072
| 434176 ||  || — || October 5, 2002 || Socorro || LINEAR || — || align=right | 1.8 km || 
|-id=177 bgcolor=#FA8072
| 434177 ||  || — || October 30, 2002 || Palomar || NEAT || — || align=right | 1.1 km || 
|-id=178 bgcolor=#fefefe
| 434178 ||  || — || October 31, 2002 || Palomar || NEAT || fast? || align=right data-sort-value="0.74" | 740 m || 
|-id=179 bgcolor=#fefefe
| 434179 ||  || — || October 31, 2002 || Palomar || NEAT || — || align=right data-sort-value="0.75" | 750 m || 
|-id=180 bgcolor=#fefefe
| 434180 ||  || — || October 31, 2002 || Palomar || NEAT || — || align=right data-sort-value="0.81" | 810 m || 
|-id=181 bgcolor=#fefefe
| 434181 ||  || — || November 12, 2002 || Socorro || LINEAR || H || align=right data-sort-value="0.89" | 890 m || 
|-id=182 bgcolor=#d6d6d6
| 434182 ||  || — || October 4, 2002 || Campo Imperatore || CINEOS || SHU3:2 || align=right | 6.6 km || 
|-id=183 bgcolor=#fefefe
| 434183 ||  || — || November 28, 2002 || Anderson Mesa || LONEOS || — || align=right | 1.0 km || 
|-id=184 bgcolor=#fefefe
| 434184 ||  || — || December 2, 2002 || Socorro || LINEAR || — || align=right | 1.5 km || 
|-id=185 bgcolor=#d6d6d6
| 434185 ||  || — || December 10, 2002 || Socorro || LINEAR || — || align=right | 3.2 km || 
|-id=186 bgcolor=#d6d6d6
| 434186 ||  || — || December 13, 2002 || Palomar || NEAT || — || align=right | 3.2 km || 
|-id=187 bgcolor=#FA8072
| 434187 ||  || — || January 1, 2003 || Socorro || LINEAR || — || align=right data-sort-value="0.86" | 860 m || 
|-id=188 bgcolor=#FFC2E0
| 434188 ||  || — || January 7, 2003 || Socorro || LINEAR || APOPHA || align=right data-sort-value="0.59" | 590 m || 
|-id=189 bgcolor=#d6d6d6
| 434189 ||  || — || January 4, 2003 || Socorro || LINEAR || — || align=right | 3.9 km || 
|-id=190 bgcolor=#d6d6d6
| 434190 ||  || — || January 1, 2003 || Socorro || LINEAR || — || align=right | 3.7 km || 
|-id=191 bgcolor=#d6d6d6
| 434191 ||  || — || January 8, 2003 || Socorro || LINEAR || — || align=right | 3.0 km || 
|-id=192 bgcolor=#d6d6d6
| 434192 ||  || — || February 2, 2003 || Palomar || NEAT || Tj (2.98) || align=right | 4.9 km || 
|-id=193 bgcolor=#d6d6d6
| 434193 ||  || — || December 28, 2002 || Kitt Peak || Spacewatch || — || align=right | 3.3 km || 
|-id=194 bgcolor=#C2E0FF
| 434194 ||  || — || March 30, 2003 || Kitt Peak || M. W. Buie || cubewano (cold)critical || align=right | 176 km || 
|-id=195 bgcolor=#E9E9E9
| 434195 ||  || — || April 7, 2003 || Kitt Peak || Spacewatch || — || align=right data-sort-value="0.75" | 750 m || 
|-id=196 bgcolor=#FFC2E0
| 434196 ||  || — || April 24, 2003 || Desert Eagle || W. K. Y. Yeung || APOPHAcritical || align=right data-sort-value="0.20" | 200 m || 
|-id=197 bgcolor=#FA8072
| 434197 ||  || — || April 30, 2003 || Kitt Peak || Spacewatch || critical || align=right data-sort-value="0.68" | 680 m || 
|-id=198 bgcolor=#fefefe
| 434198 ||  || — || July 3, 2003 || Kitt Peak || Spacewatch || — || align=right data-sort-value="0.65" | 650 m || 
|-id=199 bgcolor=#E9E9E9
| 434199 ||  || — || July 20, 2003 || Palomar || NEAT || — || align=right | 4.6 km || 
|-id=200 bgcolor=#E9E9E9
| 434200 ||  || — || August 1, 2003 || Socorro || LINEAR || (5) || align=right | 1.0 km || 
|}

434201–434300 

|-bgcolor=#E9E9E9
| 434201 ||  || — || August 4, 2003 || Socorro || LINEAR || — || align=right | 1.1 km || 
|-id=202 bgcolor=#E9E9E9
| 434202 ||  || — || August 23, 2003 || Socorro || LINEAR || (5) || align=right data-sort-value="0.73" | 730 m || 
|-id=203 bgcolor=#E9E9E9
| 434203 ||  || — || August 23, 2003 || Socorro || LINEAR || — || align=right | 1.7 km || 
|-id=204 bgcolor=#E9E9E9
| 434204 ||  || — || July 29, 2003 || Socorro || LINEAR || — || align=right | 2.1 km || 
|-id=205 bgcolor=#E9E9E9
| 434205 ||  || — || August 30, 2003 || Reedy Creek || J. Broughton || — || align=right | 1.6 km || 
|-id=206 bgcolor=#E9E9E9
| 434206 ||  || — || August 23, 2003 || Campo Imperatore || CINEOS || — || align=right | 1.5 km || 
|-id=207 bgcolor=#E9E9E9
| 434207 ||  || — || September 16, 2003 || Kitt Peak || Spacewatch || — || align=right | 1.8 km || 
|-id=208 bgcolor=#fefefe
| 434208 ||  || — || September 16, 2003 || Kitt Peak || Spacewatch || — || align=right data-sort-value="0.65" | 650 m || 
|-id=209 bgcolor=#E9E9E9
| 434209 ||  || — || September 2, 2003 || Socorro || LINEAR || — || align=right | 1.5 km || 
|-id=210 bgcolor=#fefefe
| 434210 ||  || — || September 16, 2003 || Kitt Peak || Spacewatch || — || align=right data-sort-value="0.63" | 630 m || 
|-id=211 bgcolor=#E9E9E9
| 434211 ||  || — || September 4, 2003 || Socorro || LINEAR || — || align=right | 2.8 km || 
|-id=212 bgcolor=#fefefe
| 434212 ||  || — || September 17, 2003 || Palomar || NEAT || — || align=right data-sort-value="0.85" | 850 m || 
|-id=213 bgcolor=#E9E9E9
| 434213 ||  || — || September 18, 2003 || Palomar || NEAT || — || align=right | 1.4 km || 
|-id=214 bgcolor=#E9E9E9
| 434214 ||  || — || September 16, 2003 || Anderson Mesa || LONEOS || EUN || align=right | 1.5 km || 
|-id=215 bgcolor=#E9E9E9
| 434215 ||  || — || September 16, 2003 || Socorro || LINEAR || — || align=right | 1.3 km || 
|-id=216 bgcolor=#E9E9E9
| 434216 ||  || — || September 17, 2003 || Kitt Peak || Spacewatch || — || align=right | 1.0 km || 
|-id=217 bgcolor=#E9E9E9
| 434217 ||  || — || September 18, 2003 || Kitt Peak || Spacewatch || — || align=right | 1.4 km || 
|-id=218 bgcolor=#E9E9E9
| 434218 ||  || — || September 18, 2003 || Kitt Peak || Spacewatch || — || align=right | 1.4 km || 
|-id=219 bgcolor=#E9E9E9
| 434219 ||  || — || September 18, 2003 || Kitt Peak || Spacewatch || — || align=right | 1.5 km || 
|-id=220 bgcolor=#E9E9E9
| 434220 ||  || — || September 19, 2003 || Palomar || NEAT || — || align=right | 2.6 km || 
|-id=221 bgcolor=#E9E9E9
| 434221 ||  || — || September 16, 2003 || Socorro || LINEAR || RAF || align=right | 1.2 km || 
|-id=222 bgcolor=#E9E9E9
| 434222 ||  || — || September 22, 2003 || Socorro || LINEAR || — || align=right | 1.5 km || 
|-id=223 bgcolor=#E9E9E9
| 434223 ||  || — || September 18, 2003 || Kitt Peak || Spacewatch || — || align=right | 2.9 km || 
|-id=224 bgcolor=#E9E9E9
| 434224 ||  || — || September 4, 2003 || Socorro || LINEAR || EUN || align=right | 1.4 km || 
|-id=225 bgcolor=#E9E9E9
| 434225 ||  || — || September 26, 2003 || Desert Eagle || W. K. Y. Yeung || — || align=right | 1.6 km || 
|-id=226 bgcolor=#E9E9E9
| 434226 ||  || — || September 26, 2003 || Socorro || LINEAR || — || align=right | 1.7 km || 
|-id=227 bgcolor=#E9E9E9
| 434227 ||  || — || September 28, 2003 || Socorro || LINEAR || — || align=right | 1.7 km || 
|-id=228 bgcolor=#E9E9E9
| 434228 ||  || — || September 27, 2003 || Socorro || LINEAR || — || align=right | 1.7 km || 
|-id=229 bgcolor=#E9E9E9
| 434229 ||  || — || September 27, 2003 || Socorro || LINEAR || — || align=right | 1.6 km || 
|-id=230 bgcolor=#E9E9E9
| 434230 ||  || — || September 30, 2003 || Socorro || LINEAR || — || align=right | 1.9 km || 
|-id=231 bgcolor=#FA8072
| 434231 ||  || — || September 18, 2003 || Kitt Peak || Spacewatch || — || align=right data-sort-value="0.75" | 750 m || 
|-id=232 bgcolor=#E9E9E9
| 434232 ||  || — || September 29, 2003 || Anderson Mesa || LONEOS || — || align=right | 1.3 km || 
|-id=233 bgcolor=#fefefe
| 434233 ||  || — || September 29, 2003 || Anderson Mesa || LONEOS || H || align=right data-sort-value="0.89" | 890 m || 
|-id=234 bgcolor=#fefefe
| 434234 ||  || — || September 17, 2003 || Palomar || NEAT || — || align=right data-sort-value="0.62" | 620 m || 
|-id=235 bgcolor=#fefefe
| 434235 ||  || — || September 18, 2003 || Kitt Peak || Spacewatch || — || align=right data-sort-value="0.56" | 560 m || 
|-id=236 bgcolor=#E9E9E9
| 434236 ||  || — || September 26, 2003 || Apache Point || SDSS || — || align=right | 1.6 km || 
|-id=237 bgcolor=#fefefe
| 434237 ||  || — || September 21, 2003 || Campo Imperatore || CINEOS || — || align=right data-sort-value="0.64" | 640 m || 
|-id=238 bgcolor=#E9E9E9
| 434238 ||  || — || September 26, 2003 || Apache Point || SDSS || — || align=right | 1.5 km || 
|-id=239 bgcolor=#E9E9E9
| 434239 ||  || — || September 26, 2003 || Apache Point || SDSS || — || align=right | 1.6 km || 
|-id=240 bgcolor=#E9E9E9
| 434240 ||  || — || September 26, 2003 || Apache Point || SDSS || — || align=right | 2.3 km || 
|-id=241 bgcolor=#fefefe
| 434241 ||  || — || October 18, 2003 || Palomar || NEAT || H || align=right data-sort-value="0.76" | 760 m || 
|-id=242 bgcolor=#FA8072
| 434242 ||  || — || October 22, 2003 || Socorro || LINEAR || — || align=right data-sort-value="0.57" | 570 m || 
|-id=243 bgcolor=#fefefe
| 434243 ||  || — || October 22, 2003 || Socorro || LINEAR || — || align=right | 1.0 km || 
|-id=244 bgcolor=#E9E9E9
| 434244 ||  || — || September 20, 2003 || Anderson Mesa || LONEOS || — || align=right | 1.9 km || 
|-id=245 bgcolor=#E9E9E9
| 434245 ||  || — || October 17, 2003 || Kitt Peak || Spacewatch || — || align=right | 2.1 km || 
|-id=246 bgcolor=#E9E9E9
| 434246 ||  || — || October 17, 2003 || Kitt Peak || Spacewatch || — || align=right | 3.1 km || 
|-id=247 bgcolor=#E9E9E9
| 434247 ||  || — || October 18, 2003 || Kitt Peak || Spacewatch || — || align=right | 2.6 km || 
|-id=248 bgcolor=#fefefe
| 434248 ||  || — || October 24, 2003 || Socorro || LINEAR || — || align=right data-sort-value="0.82" | 820 m || 
|-id=249 bgcolor=#E9E9E9
| 434249 ||  || — || September 30, 2003 || Socorro || LINEAR || — || align=right | 2.3 km || 
|-id=250 bgcolor=#E9E9E9
| 434250 ||  || — || October 23, 2003 || Anderson Mesa || LONEOS || EUN || align=right | 1.5 km || 
|-id=251 bgcolor=#fefefe
| 434251 ||  || — || October 18, 2003 || Kitt Peak || Spacewatch || — || align=right data-sort-value="0.59" | 590 m || 
|-id=252 bgcolor=#FA8072
| 434252 ||  || — || October 23, 2003 || Anderson Mesa || LONEOS || H || align=right data-sort-value="0.75" | 750 m || 
|-id=253 bgcolor=#E9E9E9
| 434253 ||  || — || October 17, 2003 || Kitt Peak || Spacewatch || — || align=right | 2.2 km || 
|-id=254 bgcolor=#E9E9E9
| 434254 ||  || — || October 18, 2003 || Anderson Mesa || LONEOS || — || align=right | 3.0 km || 
|-id=255 bgcolor=#fefefe
| 434255 ||  || — || October 5, 2003 || Kitt Peak || Spacewatch || — || align=right data-sort-value="0.56" | 560 m || 
|-id=256 bgcolor=#E9E9E9
| 434256 ||  || — || September 16, 2003 || Kitt Peak || Spacewatch || — || align=right | 2.0 km || 
|-id=257 bgcolor=#E9E9E9
| 434257 ||  || — || October 21, 2003 || Kitt Peak || Spacewatch || — || align=right | 2.1 km || 
|-id=258 bgcolor=#E9E9E9
| 434258 ||  || — || September 22, 2003 || Kitt Peak || Spacewatch || — || align=right | 2.1 km || 
|-id=259 bgcolor=#E9E9E9
| 434259 ||  || — || September 22, 2003 || Kitt Peak || Spacewatch || — || align=right | 2.6 km || 
|-id=260 bgcolor=#E9E9E9
| 434260 ||  || — || October 21, 2003 || Socorro || LINEAR || — || align=right | 2.3 km || 
|-id=261 bgcolor=#E9E9E9
| 434261 ||  || — || October 23, 2003 || Kitt Peak || Spacewatch || — || align=right | 1.7 km || 
|-id=262 bgcolor=#fefefe
| 434262 ||  || — || October 23, 2003 || Kitt Peak || Spacewatch || — || align=right data-sort-value="0.72" | 720 m || 
|-id=263 bgcolor=#E9E9E9
| 434263 ||  || — || October 25, 2003 || Socorro || LINEAR || — || align=right | 2.7 km || 
|-id=264 bgcolor=#E9E9E9
| 434264 ||  || — || October 17, 2003 || Anderson Mesa || LONEOS || — || align=right | 2.8 km || 
|-id=265 bgcolor=#E9E9E9
| 434265 ||  || — || October 19, 2003 || Apache Point || SDSS || — || align=right | 2.1 km || 
|-id=266 bgcolor=#E9E9E9
| 434266 ||  || — || October 22, 2003 || Kitt Peak || Spacewatch || GEF || align=right | 1.2 km || 
|-id=267 bgcolor=#E9E9E9
| 434267 ||  || — || November 18, 2003 || Palomar || NEAT || — || align=right | 2.8 km || 
|-id=268 bgcolor=#E9E9E9
| 434268 ||  || — || October 19, 2003 || Kitt Peak || Spacewatch || — || align=right | 2.1 km || 
|-id=269 bgcolor=#E9E9E9
| 434269 ||  || — || November 18, 2003 || Kitt Peak || Spacewatch || — || align=right | 3.1 km || 
|-id=270 bgcolor=#fefefe
| 434270 ||  || — || November 20, 2003 || Socorro || LINEAR || H || align=right data-sort-value="0.89" | 890 m || 
|-id=271 bgcolor=#fefefe
| 434271 ||  || — || November 19, 2003 || Anderson Mesa || LONEOS || — || align=right data-sort-value="0.71" | 710 m || 
|-id=272 bgcolor=#E9E9E9
| 434272 ||  || — || November 18, 2003 || Palomar || NEAT || — || align=right | 1.9 km || 
|-id=273 bgcolor=#FA8072
| 434273 ||  || — || October 24, 2003 || Kitt Peak || Spacewatch || — || align=right data-sort-value="0.78" | 780 m || 
|-id=274 bgcolor=#E9E9E9
| 434274 ||  || — || November 20, 2003 || Socorro || LINEAR || — || align=right | 1.4 km || 
|-id=275 bgcolor=#fefefe
| 434275 ||  || — || November 20, 2003 || Catalina || CSS || H || align=right data-sort-value="0.72" | 720 m || 
|-id=276 bgcolor=#fefefe
| 434276 ||  || — || November 18, 2003 || Kitt Peak || Spacewatch || — || align=right data-sort-value="0.81" | 810 m || 
|-id=277 bgcolor=#d6d6d6
| 434277 ||  || — || November 20, 2003 || Socorro || LINEAR || — || align=right | 3.1 km || 
|-id=278 bgcolor=#fefefe
| 434278 ||  || — || November 16, 2003 || Catalina || CSS || — || align=right data-sort-value="0.66" | 660 m || 
|-id=279 bgcolor=#E9E9E9
| 434279 ||  || — || December 1, 2003 || Socorro || LINEAR || fast? || align=right | 2.7 km || 
|-id=280 bgcolor=#E9E9E9
| 434280 ||  || — || December 1, 2003 || Kitt Peak || Spacewatch || — || align=right | 1.5 km || 
|-id=281 bgcolor=#E9E9E9
| 434281 ||  || — || December 3, 2003 || Socorro || LINEAR || — || align=right | 2.4 km || 
|-id=282 bgcolor=#fefefe
| 434282 ||  || — || October 20, 2003 || Socorro || LINEAR || — || align=right | 1.2 km || 
|-id=283 bgcolor=#fefefe
| 434283 ||  || — || December 18, 2003 || Palomar || NEAT || H || align=right data-sort-value="0.94" | 940 m || 
|-id=284 bgcolor=#E9E9E9
| 434284 ||  || — || December 4, 2003 || Socorro || LINEAR || — || align=right | 2.9 km || 
|-id=285 bgcolor=#E9E9E9
| 434285 ||  || — || December 27, 2003 || Socorro || LINEAR || — || align=right | 1.8 km || 
|-id=286 bgcolor=#E9E9E9
| 434286 ||  || — || November 19, 2003 || Socorro || LINEAR || — || align=right | 2.2 km || 
|-id=287 bgcolor=#d6d6d6
| 434287 ||  || — || December 18, 2003 || Kitt Peak || Spacewatch || — || align=right | 2.8 km || 
|-id=288 bgcolor=#d6d6d6
| 434288 ||  || — || January 17, 2004 || Palomar || NEAT || — || align=right | 2.7 km || 
|-id=289 bgcolor=#fefefe
| 434289 ||  || — || January 17, 2004 || Palomar || NEAT || — || align=right data-sort-value="0.67" | 670 m || 
|-id=290 bgcolor=#fefefe
| 434290 ||  || — || January 23, 2004 || Socorro || LINEAR || H || align=right data-sort-value="0.98" | 980 m || 
|-id=291 bgcolor=#fefefe
| 434291 ||  || — || January 22, 2004 || Socorro || LINEAR || — || align=right data-sort-value="0.80" | 800 m || 
|-id=292 bgcolor=#fefefe
| 434292 ||  || — || January 22, 2004 || Socorro || LINEAR || H || align=right data-sort-value="0.85" | 850 m || 
|-id=293 bgcolor=#d6d6d6
| 434293 ||  || — || January 28, 2004 || Kitt Peak || Spacewatch || — || align=right | 2.0 km || 
|-id=294 bgcolor=#fefefe
| 434294 ||  || — || January 30, 2004 || Kitt Peak || Spacewatch || critical || align=right data-sort-value="0.57" | 570 m || 
|-id=295 bgcolor=#fefefe
| 434295 ||  || — || February 12, 2004 || Kitt Peak || Spacewatch || — || align=right data-sort-value="0.66" | 660 m || 
|-id=296 bgcolor=#fefefe
| 434296 ||  || — || February 17, 2004 || Socorro || LINEAR || — || align=right data-sort-value="0.87" | 870 m || 
|-id=297 bgcolor=#d6d6d6
| 434297 ||  || — || February 19, 2004 || Socorro || LINEAR || — || align=right | 2.6 km || 
|-id=298 bgcolor=#fefefe
| 434298 ||  || — || March 12, 2004 || Palomar || NEAT || — || align=right | 1.0 km || 
|-id=299 bgcolor=#d6d6d6
| 434299 ||  || — || March 15, 2004 || Kitt Peak || Spacewatch || — || align=right | 2.0 km || 
|-id=300 bgcolor=#fefefe
| 434300 ||  || — || March 11, 2004 || Palomar || NEAT || — || align=right | 1.0 km || 
|}

434301–434400 

|-bgcolor=#d6d6d6
| 434301 ||  || — || March 15, 2004 || Socorro || LINEAR || — || align=right | 2.3 km || 
|-id=302 bgcolor=#fefefe
| 434302 ||  || — || March 15, 2004 || Kitt Peak || Spacewatch || — || align=right data-sort-value="0.82" | 820 m || 
|-id=303 bgcolor=#d6d6d6
| 434303 ||  || — || March 15, 2004 || Kitt Peak || Spacewatch || EOS || align=right | 1.5 km || 
|-id=304 bgcolor=#d6d6d6
| 434304 ||  || — || February 23, 2004 || Socorro || LINEAR || — || align=right | 3.7 km || 
|-id=305 bgcolor=#d6d6d6
| 434305 ||  || — || March 17, 2004 || Socorro || LINEAR || — || align=right | 2.6 km || 
|-id=306 bgcolor=#fefefe
| 434306 ||  || — || March 19, 2004 || Socorro || LINEAR || — || align=right data-sort-value="0.80" | 800 m || 
|-id=307 bgcolor=#fefefe
| 434307 ||  || — || March 30, 2004 || Catalina || CSS || — || align=right | 1.2 km || 
|-id=308 bgcolor=#fefefe
| 434308 ||  || — || March 16, 2004 || Socorro || LINEAR || — || align=right data-sort-value="0.98" | 980 m || 
|-id=309 bgcolor=#fefefe
| 434309 ||  || — || March 26, 2004 || Socorro || LINEAR || — || align=right data-sort-value="0.98" | 980 m || 
|-id=310 bgcolor=#fefefe
| 434310 ||  || — || March 18, 2004 || Socorro || LINEAR || — || align=right data-sort-value="0.75" | 750 m || 
|-id=311 bgcolor=#d6d6d6
| 434311 ||  || — || March 27, 2004 || Catalina || CSS || — || align=right | 3.2 km || 
|-id=312 bgcolor=#fefefe
| 434312 ||  || — || March 18, 2004 || Kitt Peak || Spacewatch || — || align=right data-sort-value="0.78" | 780 m || 
|-id=313 bgcolor=#FFC2E0
| 434313 ||  || — || April 9, 2004 || Socorro || LINEAR || ATEcritical || align=right data-sort-value="0.47" | 470 m || 
|-id=314 bgcolor=#fefefe
| 434314 ||  || — || April 12, 2004 || Anderson Mesa || LONEOS || — || align=right data-sort-value="0.73" | 730 m || 
|-id=315 bgcolor=#fefefe
| 434315 ||  || — || April 14, 2004 || Socorro || LINEAR || H || align=right data-sort-value="0.83" | 830 m || 
|-id=316 bgcolor=#fefefe
| 434316 ||  || — || March 31, 2004 || Kitt Peak || Spacewatch || MAScritical || align=right data-sort-value="0.62" | 620 m || 
|-id=317 bgcolor=#fefefe
| 434317 ||  || — || April 12, 2004 || Kitt Peak || Spacewatch || V || align=right data-sort-value="0.57" | 570 m || 
|-id=318 bgcolor=#fefefe
| 434318 ||  || — || March 16, 2004 || Kitt Peak || Spacewatch || NYS || align=right data-sort-value="0.58" | 580 m || 
|-id=319 bgcolor=#d6d6d6
| 434319 ||  || — || April 13, 2004 || Kitt Peak || Spacewatch || EOS || align=right | 1.7 km || 
|-id=320 bgcolor=#d6d6d6
| 434320 ||  || — || April 15, 2004 || Bergisch Gladbach || W. Bickel || — || align=right | 2.2 km || 
|-id=321 bgcolor=#d6d6d6
| 434321 ||  || — || April 14, 2004 || Catalina || CSS || — || align=right | 3.8 km || 
|-id=322 bgcolor=#fefefe
| 434322 ||  || — || March 15, 2004 || Kitt Peak || Spacewatch || — || align=right data-sort-value="0.69" | 690 m || 
|-id=323 bgcolor=#d6d6d6
| 434323 ||  || — || April 17, 2004 || Socorro || LINEAR || — || align=right | 5.0 km || 
|-id=324 bgcolor=#fefefe
| 434324 ||  || — || April 25, 2004 || Kitt Peak || Spacewatch || MAS || align=right data-sort-value="0.58" | 580 m || 
|-id=325 bgcolor=#d6d6d6
| 434325 ||  || — || May 11, 2004 || Catalina || CSS || Tj (2.86) || align=right | 3.1 km || 
|-id=326 bgcolor=#FFC2E0
| 434326 ||  || — || May 11, 2004 || Anderson Mesa || LONEOS || ATIPHA || align=right data-sort-value="0.70" | 700 m || 
|-id=327 bgcolor=#d6d6d6
| 434327 ||  || — || May 9, 2004 || Kitt Peak || Spacewatch || — || align=right | 3.8 km || 
|-id=328 bgcolor=#d6d6d6
| 434328 ||  || — || May 12, 2004 || Catalina || CSS || — || align=right | 4.4 km || 
|-id=329 bgcolor=#E9E9E9
| 434329 ||  || — || May 14, 2004 || Palomar || NEAT || — || align=right | 2.9 km || 
|-id=330 bgcolor=#d6d6d6
| 434330 ||  || — || May 13, 2004 || Palomar || NEAT || — || align=right | 4.6 km || 
|-id=331 bgcolor=#d6d6d6
| 434331 ||  || — || May 14, 2004 || Kitt Peak || Spacewatch || — || align=right | 3.7 km || 
|-id=332 bgcolor=#d6d6d6
| 434332 ||  || — || May 12, 2004 || Apache Point || SDSS || — || align=right | 2.8 km || 
|-id=333 bgcolor=#d6d6d6
| 434333 ||  || — || May 17, 2004 || Socorro || LINEAR || Tj (2.97) || align=right | 3.5 km || 
|-id=334 bgcolor=#d6d6d6
| 434334 ||  || — || May 19, 2004 || Kitt Peak || Spacewatch || — || align=right | 4.8 km || 
|-id=335 bgcolor=#d6d6d6
| 434335 ||  || — || June 13, 2004 || Kitt Peak || Spacewatch || THB || align=right | 3.2 km || 
|-id=336 bgcolor=#E9E9E9
| 434336 ||  || — || April 25, 2003 || Kitt Peak || Spacewatch || EUN || align=right | 2.1 km || 
|-id=337 bgcolor=#d6d6d6
| 434337 ||  || — || June 12, 2004 || Kitt Peak || Spacewatch || — || align=right | 3.2 km || 
|-id=338 bgcolor=#d6d6d6
| 434338 ||  || — || June 13, 2004 || Socorro || LINEAR || Tj (2.99) || align=right | 5.8 km || 
|-id=339 bgcolor=#fefefe
| 434339 ||  || — || June 27, 2004 || Siding Spring || SSS || — || align=right data-sort-value="0.98" | 980 m || 
|-id=340 bgcolor=#fefefe
| 434340 ||  || — || August 8, 2004 || Socorro || LINEAR || NYS || align=right data-sort-value="0.76" | 760 m || 
|-id=341 bgcolor=#fefefe
| 434341 ||  || — || August 10, 2004 || Socorro || LINEAR || — || align=right data-sort-value="0.99" | 990 m || 
|-id=342 bgcolor=#d6d6d6
| 434342 ||  || — || August 25, 2004 || Socorro || LINEAR || — || align=right | 4.9 km || 
|-id=343 bgcolor=#E9E9E9
| 434343 || 2004 RG || — || September 2, 2004 || Kleť || Kleť Obs. || EUN || align=right | 1.2 km || 
|-id=344 bgcolor=#FFC2E0
| 434344 ||  || — || September 8, 2004 || Socorro || LINEAR || APO || align=right data-sort-value="0.40" | 400 m || 
|-id=345 bgcolor=#fefefe
| 434345 ||  || — || September 7, 2004 || Kitt Peak || Spacewatch || NYS || align=right data-sort-value="0.60" | 600 m || 
|-id=346 bgcolor=#E9E9E9
| 434346 ||  || — || September 8, 2004 || Socorro || LINEAR || — || align=right data-sort-value="0.86" | 860 m || 
|-id=347 bgcolor=#fefefe
| 434347 ||  || — || September 7, 2004 || Kitt Peak || Spacewatch || — || align=right data-sort-value="0.65" | 650 m || 
|-id=348 bgcolor=#fefefe
| 434348 ||  || — || September 8, 2004 || Socorro || LINEAR || — || align=right data-sort-value="0.75" | 750 m || 
|-id=349 bgcolor=#fefefe
| 434349 ||  || — || September 8, 2004 || Palomar || NEAT || — || align=right | 1.2 km || 
|-id=350 bgcolor=#E9E9E9
| 434350 ||  || — || September 8, 2004 || Socorro || LINEAR || — || align=right | 1.9 km || 
|-id=351 bgcolor=#fefefe
| 434351 ||  || — || September 9, 2004 || Socorro || LINEAR || — || align=right data-sort-value="0.66" | 660 m || 
|-id=352 bgcolor=#E9E9E9
| 434352 ||  || — || September 10, 2004 || Socorro || LINEAR || — || align=right | 1.3 km || 
|-id=353 bgcolor=#fefefe
| 434353 ||  || — || September 7, 2004 || Palomar || NEAT || — || align=right | 1.3 km || 
|-id=354 bgcolor=#fefefe
| 434354 ||  || — || September 11, 2004 || Socorro || LINEAR || — || align=right | 1.2 km || 
|-id=355 bgcolor=#fefefe
| 434355 ||  || — || September 11, 2004 || Socorro || LINEAR || — || align=right | 1.0 km || 
|-id=356 bgcolor=#E9E9E9
| 434356 ||  || — || September 10, 2004 || Kitt Peak || Spacewatch || — || align=right | 1.0 km || 
|-id=357 bgcolor=#E9E9E9
| 434357 ||  || — || September 12, 2004 || Mauna Kea || P. A. Wiegert || — || align=right | 1.0 km || 
|-id=358 bgcolor=#E9E9E9
| 434358 ||  || — || September 7, 2004 || Kitt Peak || Spacewatch || — || align=right | 1.1 km || 
|-id=359 bgcolor=#E9E9E9
| 434359 ||  || — || September 18, 2004 || Socorro || LINEAR || — || align=right data-sort-value="0.92" | 920 m || 
|-id=360 bgcolor=#E9E9E9
| 434360 ||  || — || September 22, 2004 || Socorro || LINEAR || — || align=right | 2.6 km || 
|-id=361 bgcolor=#E9E9E9
| 434361 ||  || — || October 4, 2004 || Kitt Peak || Spacewatch || — || align=right data-sort-value="0.85" | 850 m || 
|-id=362 bgcolor=#E9E9E9
| 434362 ||  || — || October 4, 2004 || Kitt Peak || Spacewatch || — || align=right | 1.2 km || 
|-id=363 bgcolor=#E9E9E9
| 434363 ||  || — || October 4, 2004 || Kitt Peak || Spacewatch || — || align=right | 2.1 km || 
|-id=364 bgcolor=#E9E9E9
| 434364 ||  || — || October 5, 2004 || Kitt Peak || Spacewatch || — || align=right data-sort-value="0.96" | 960 m || 
|-id=365 bgcolor=#E9E9E9
| 434365 ||  || — || October 7, 2004 || Kitt Peak || Spacewatch || — || align=right data-sort-value="0.83" | 830 m || 
|-id=366 bgcolor=#E9E9E9
| 434366 ||  || — || October 5, 2004 || Kitt Peak || Spacewatch || — || align=right | 1.2 km || 
|-id=367 bgcolor=#E9E9E9
| 434367 ||  || — || September 7, 2004 || Kitt Peak || Spacewatch || — || align=right | 1.8 km || 
|-id=368 bgcolor=#E9E9E9
| 434368 ||  || — || October 7, 2004 || Kitt Peak || Spacewatch || — || align=right | 1.3 km || 
|-id=369 bgcolor=#E9E9E9
| 434369 ||  || — || October 4, 2004 || Kitt Peak || Spacewatch || — || align=right | 1.1 km || 
|-id=370 bgcolor=#E9E9E9
| 434370 ||  || — || October 9, 2004 || Kitt Peak || Spacewatch || — || align=right | 1.7 km || 
|-id=371 bgcolor=#E9E9E9
| 434371 ||  || — || October 9, 2004 || Kitt Peak || Spacewatch || — || align=right | 1.6 km || 
|-id=372 bgcolor=#E9E9E9
| 434372 ||  || — || October 9, 2004 || Kitt Peak || Spacewatch || MAR || align=right | 1.1 km || 
|-id=373 bgcolor=#E9E9E9
| 434373 ||  || — || October 11, 2004 || Kitt Peak || Spacewatch || — || align=right data-sort-value="0.99" | 990 m || 
|-id=374 bgcolor=#E9E9E9
| 434374 ||  || — || October 11, 2004 || Kitt Peak || Spacewatch || EUN || align=right | 1.0 km || 
|-id=375 bgcolor=#E9E9E9
| 434375 ||  || — || October 12, 2004 || Socorro || LINEAR || MAR || align=right | 1.2 km || 
|-id=376 bgcolor=#E9E9E9
| 434376 ||  || — || September 14, 2004 || Socorro || LINEAR || — || align=right | 1.3 km || 
|-id=377 bgcolor=#E9E9E9
| 434377 ||  || — || October 13, 2004 || Kitt Peak || Spacewatch || — || align=right | 2.3 km || 
|-id=378 bgcolor=#E9E9E9
| 434378 ||  || — || October 10, 2004 || Kitt Peak || Spacewatch || — || align=right | 1.7 km || 
|-id=379 bgcolor=#E9E9E9
| 434379 ||  || — || October 10, 2004 || Kitt Peak || Spacewatch || — || align=right | 2.2 km || 
|-id=380 bgcolor=#FA8072
| 434380 ||  || — || October 20, 2004 || Socorro || LINEAR || — || align=right data-sort-value="0.88" | 880 m || 
|-id=381 bgcolor=#E9E9E9
| 434381 ||  || — || October 15, 2004 || Mount Lemmon || Mount Lemmon Survey || — || align=right | 2.9 km || 
|-id=382 bgcolor=#E9E9E9
| 434382 ||  || — || November 4, 2004 || Kitt Peak || Spacewatch || — || align=right | 1.5 km || 
|-id=383 bgcolor=#E9E9E9
| 434383 ||  || — || November 12, 2004 || Catalina || CSS || — || align=right | 2.0 km || 
|-id=384 bgcolor=#E9E9E9
| 434384 ||  || — || November 10, 2004 || Kitt Peak || Spacewatch || JUN || align=right | 1.3 km || 
|-id=385 bgcolor=#E9E9E9
| 434385 ||  || — || November 20, 2004 || Kitt Peak || Spacewatch || — || align=right | 1.7 km || 
|-id=386 bgcolor=#E9E9E9
| 434386 ||  || — || December 2, 2004 || Kitt Peak || Spacewatch || AEO || align=right | 1.1 km || 
|-id=387 bgcolor=#fefefe
| 434387 ||  || — || February 20, 2002 || Kitt Peak || Spacewatch || — || align=right data-sort-value="0.68" | 680 m || 
|-id=388 bgcolor=#E9E9E9
| 434388 ||  || — || January 17, 2005 || Kitt Peak || Spacewatch || — || align=right | 2.2 km || 
|-id=389 bgcolor=#d6d6d6
| 434389 ||  || — || February 2, 2005 || Catalina || CSS || — || align=right | 2.0 km || 
|-id=390 bgcolor=#C2E0FF
| 434390 ||  || — || February 10, 2005 || Mauna Kea || CFEPS || SDOcritical || align=right | 103 km || 
|-id=391 bgcolor=#d6d6d6
| 434391 ||  || — || March 8, 2005 || Anderson Mesa || LONEOS || — || align=right | 3.2 km || 
|-id=392 bgcolor=#E9E9E9
| 434392 ||  || — || March 10, 2005 || Mount Lemmon || Mount Lemmon Survey || — || align=right | 2.8 km || 
|-id=393 bgcolor=#d6d6d6
| 434393 ||  || — || March 12, 2005 || Mount Lemmon || Mount Lemmon Survey || — || align=right | 2.1 km || 
|-id=394 bgcolor=#fefefe
| 434394 ||  || — || March 12, 2005 || Kitt Peak || Spacewatch || — || align=right data-sort-value="0.61" | 610 m || 
|-id=395 bgcolor=#E9E9E9
| 434395 ||  || — || March 13, 2005 || Kitt Peak || Spacewatch || AGN || align=right | 1.1 km || 
|-id=396 bgcolor=#d6d6d6
| 434396 ||  || — || March 9, 2005 || Mount Lemmon || Mount Lemmon Survey || — || align=right | 2.4 km || 
|-id=397 bgcolor=#d6d6d6
| 434397 ||  || — || March 10, 2005 || Kitt Peak || M. W. Buie || — || align=right | 2.0 km || 
|-id=398 bgcolor=#fefefe
| 434398 ||  || — || March 8, 2005 || Mount Lemmon || Mount Lemmon Survey || — || align=right data-sort-value="0.69" | 690 m || 
|-id=399 bgcolor=#d6d6d6
| 434399 ||  || — || April 2, 2005 || Mount Lemmon || Mount Lemmon Survey || — || align=right | 1.8 km || 
|-id=400 bgcolor=#d6d6d6
| 434400 ||  || — || March 16, 2005 || Kitt Peak || Spacewatch || — || align=right | 1.5 km || 
|}

434401–434500 

|-bgcolor=#fefefe
| 434401 ||  || — || April 6, 2005 || Kitt Peak || Spacewatch || — || align=right data-sort-value="0.69" | 690 m || 
|-id=402 bgcolor=#d6d6d6
| 434402 ||  || — || April 7, 2005 || Kitt Peak || Spacewatch || — || align=right | 2.2 km || 
|-id=403 bgcolor=#fefefe
| 434403 ||  || — || April 10, 2005 || Kitt Peak || Spacewatch || — || align=right data-sort-value="0.64" | 640 m || 
|-id=404 bgcolor=#fefefe
| 434404 ||  || — || April 6, 2005 || Catalina || CSS || H || align=right data-sort-value="0.77" | 770 m || 
|-id=405 bgcolor=#d6d6d6
| 434405 ||  || — || May 3, 2005 || Catalina || CSS || — || align=right | 2.7 km || 
|-id=406 bgcolor=#fefefe
| 434406 ||  || — || May 4, 2005 || Kitt Peak || Spacewatch || — || align=right data-sort-value="0.60" | 600 m || 
|-id=407 bgcolor=#fefefe
| 434407 ||  || — || May 7, 2005 || Kitt Peak || Spacewatch || — || align=right data-sort-value="0.67" | 670 m || 
|-id=408 bgcolor=#fefefe
| 434408 ||  || — || May 4, 2005 || Kitt Peak || Spacewatch || — || align=right data-sort-value="0.61" | 610 m || 
|-id=409 bgcolor=#fefefe
| 434409 ||  || — || May 7, 2005 || Kitt Peak || Spacewatch || — || align=right data-sort-value="0.57" | 570 m || 
|-id=410 bgcolor=#d6d6d6
| 434410 ||  || — || May 10, 2005 || Catalina || CSS || — || align=right | 1.4 km || 
|-id=411 bgcolor=#d6d6d6
| 434411 ||  || — || May 9, 2005 || Kitt Peak || Spacewatch || — || align=right | 2.4 km || 
|-id=412 bgcolor=#fefefe
| 434412 ||  || — || May 14, 2005 || Kitt Peak || Spacewatch || — || align=right data-sort-value="0.53" | 530 m || 
|-id=413 bgcolor=#d6d6d6
| 434413 ||  || — || May 15, 2005 || Palomar || NEAT || — || align=right | 4.2 km || 
|-id=414 bgcolor=#d6d6d6
| 434414 ||  || — || April 11, 2005 || Mount Lemmon || Mount Lemmon Survey || — || align=right | 2.9 km || 
|-id=415 bgcolor=#d6d6d6
| 434415 ||  || — || May 10, 2005 || Cerro Tololo || M. W. Buie || — || align=right | 2.2 km || 
|-id=416 bgcolor=#fefefe
| 434416 ||  || — || June 1, 2005 || Kitt Peak || Spacewatch || — || align=right data-sort-value="0.61" | 610 m || 
|-id=417 bgcolor=#d6d6d6
| 434417 ||  || — || May 15, 2005 || Mount Lemmon || Mount Lemmon Survey || EOS || align=right | 2.3 km || 
|-id=418 bgcolor=#fefefe
| 434418 ||  || — || June 15, 2005 || Mount Lemmon || Mount Lemmon Survey || — || align=right data-sort-value="0.76" | 760 m || 
|-id=419 bgcolor=#FA8072
| 434419 ||  || — || June 16, 2005 || Mount Lemmon || Mount Lemmon Survey || — || align=right data-sort-value="0.71" | 710 m || 
|-id=420 bgcolor=#fefefe
| 434420 ||  || — || June 29, 2005 || Palomar || NEAT || — || align=right data-sort-value="0.70" | 700 m || 
|-id=421 bgcolor=#fefefe
| 434421 ||  || — || June 28, 2005 || Palomar || NEAT || — || align=right data-sort-value="0.77" | 770 m || 
|-id=422 bgcolor=#d6d6d6
| 434422 ||  || — || June 27, 2005 || Kitt Peak || Spacewatch || — || align=right | 2.3 km || 
|-id=423 bgcolor=#fefefe
| 434423 ||  || — || June 27, 2005 || Kitt Peak || Spacewatch || — || align=right data-sort-value="0.82" | 820 m || 
|-id=424 bgcolor=#fefefe
| 434424 ||  || — || June 29, 2005 || Kitt Peak || Spacewatch || — || align=right data-sort-value="0.70" | 700 m || 
|-id=425 bgcolor=#d6d6d6
| 434425 ||  || — || June 29, 2005 || Kitt Peak || Spacewatch || — || align=right | 2.9 km || 
|-id=426 bgcolor=#fefefe
| 434426 ||  || — || June 30, 2005 || Kitt Peak || Spacewatch || — || align=right data-sort-value="0.76" | 760 m || 
|-id=427 bgcolor=#fefefe
| 434427 ||  || — || June 15, 2005 || Kitt Peak || Spacewatch || — || align=right data-sort-value="0.87" | 870 m || 
|-id=428 bgcolor=#d6d6d6
| 434428 ||  || — || July 1, 2005 || Kitt Peak || Spacewatch || — || align=right | 3.6 km || 
|-id=429 bgcolor=#fefefe
| 434429 ||  || — || July 2, 2005 || Kitt Peak || Spacewatch || — || align=right data-sort-value="0.78" | 780 m || 
|-id=430 bgcolor=#d6d6d6
| 434430 ||  || — || July 4, 2005 || Mount Lemmon || Mount Lemmon Survey || — || align=right | 3.6 km || 
|-id=431 bgcolor=#FA8072
| 434431 ||  || — || July 5, 2005 || Kitt Peak || Spacewatch || unusual || align=right | 3.0 km || 
|-id=432 bgcolor=#FA8072
| 434432 ||  || — || July 4, 2005 || Kitt Peak || Spacewatch || — || align=right data-sort-value="0.49" | 490 m || 
|-id=433 bgcolor=#d6d6d6
| 434433 ||  || — || July 1, 2005 || Kitt Peak || Spacewatch || Tj (2.96) || align=right | 3.4 km || 
|-id=434 bgcolor=#fefefe
| 434434 ||  || — || July 2, 2005 || Kitt Peak || Spacewatch || — || align=right data-sort-value="0.59" | 590 m || 
|-id=435 bgcolor=#fefefe
| 434435 ||  || — || July 3, 2005 || Mount Lemmon || Mount Lemmon Survey || — || align=right data-sort-value="0.68" | 680 m || 
|-id=436 bgcolor=#d6d6d6
| 434436 ||  || — || July 4, 2005 || Kitt Peak || Spacewatch || — || align=right | 2.8 km || 
|-id=437 bgcolor=#d6d6d6
| 434437 ||  || — || July 5, 2005 || Kitt Peak || Spacewatch || — || align=right | 4.4 km || 
|-id=438 bgcolor=#d6d6d6
| 434438 ||  || — || July 5, 2005 || Kitt Peak || Spacewatch || — || align=right | 2.8 km || 
|-id=439 bgcolor=#d6d6d6
| 434439 ||  || — || July 6, 2005 || Kitt Peak || Spacewatch || — || align=right | 2.8 km || 
|-id=440 bgcolor=#fefefe
| 434440 ||  || — || June 18, 2005 || Mount Lemmon || Mount Lemmon Survey || — || align=right data-sort-value="0.82" | 820 m || 
|-id=441 bgcolor=#d6d6d6
| 434441 ||  || — || July 7, 2005 || Kitt Peak || Spacewatch || — || align=right | 3.3 km || 
|-id=442 bgcolor=#fefefe
| 434442 ||  || — || July 10, 2005 || Siding Spring || SSS || — || align=right data-sort-value="0.89" | 890 m || 
|-id=443 bgcolor=#d6d6d6
| 434443 ||  || — || June 13, 2005 || Mount Lemmon || Mount Lemmon Survey || — || align=right | 3.5 km || 
|-id=444 bgcolor=#d6d6d6
| 434444 ||  || — || July 5, 2005 || Mount Lemmon || Mount Lemmon Survey || — || align=right | 2.9 km || 
|-id=445 bgcolor=#fefefe
| 434445 ||  || — || July 11, 2005 || Kitt Peak || Spacewatch || — || align=right data-sort-value="0.60" | 600 m || 
|-id=446 bgcolor=#d6d6d6
| 434446 ||  || — || July 1, 2005 || Kitt Peak || Spacewatch || — || align=right | 3.1 km || 
|-id=447 bgcolor=#d6d6d6
| 434447 ||  || — || July 5, 2005 || Kitt Peak || Spacewatch || — || align=right | 3.0 km || 
|-id=448 bgcolor=#fefefe
| 434448 ||  || — || July 30, 2005 || Campo Imperatore || CINEOS || — || align=right data-sort-value="0.79" | 790 m || 
|-id=449 bgcolor=#d6d6d6
| 434449 ||  || — || July 30, 2005 || Palomar || NEAT || — || align=right | 2.7 km || 
|-id=450 bgcolor=#d6d6d6
| 434450 ||  || — || July 27, 2005 || Palomar || NEAT || — || align=right | 3.5 km || 
|-id=451 bgcolor=#FA8072
| 434451 ||  || — || August 4, 2005 || Palomar || NEAT || — || align=right data-sort-value="0.71" | 710 m || 
|-id=452 bgcolor=#fefefe
| 434452 ||  || — || August 4, 2005 || Palomar || NEAT || — || align=right data-sort-value="0.74" | 740 m || 
|-id=453 bgcolor=#d6d6d6
| 434453 Ayerdhal ||  ||  || August 9, 2005 || Saint-Sulpice || B. Christophe || EOS || align=right | 2.3 km || 
|-id=454 bgcolor=#fefefe
| 434454 ||  || — || August 22, 2005 || Palomar || NEAT || — || align=right data-sort-value="0.82" | 820 m || 
|-id=455 bgcolor=#FA8072
| 434455 ||  || — || August 22, 2005 || Palomar || NEAT || H || align=right data-sort-value="0.75" | 750 m || 
|-id=456 bgcolor=#d6d6d6
| 434456 ||  || — || August 24, 2005 || Palomar || NEAT || — || align=right | 2.4 km || 
|-id=457 bgcolor=#fefefe
| 434457 ||  || — || August 25, 2005 || Palomar || NEAT || — || align=right data-sort-value="0.81" | 810 m || 
|-id=458 bgcolor=#d6d6d6
| 434458 ||  || — || August 27, 2005 || Kitt Peak || Spacewatch || — || align=right | 4.3 km || 
|-id=459 bgcolor=#d6d6d6
| 434459 ||  || — || August 27, 2005 || Kitt Peak || Spacewatch || — || align=right | 2.2 km || 
|-id=460 bgcolor=#fefefe
| 434460 ||  || — || August 25, 2005 || Palomar || NEAT || — || align=right data-sort-value="0.95" | 950 m || 
|-id=461 bgcolor=#fefefe
| 434461 ||  || — || August 25, 2005 || Palomar || NEAT || — || align=right data-sort-value="0.73" | 730 m || 
|-id=462 bgcolor=#d6d6d6
| 434462 ||  || — || August 26, 2005 || Palomar || NEAT || — || align=right | 2.9 km || 
|-id=463 bgcolor=#fefefe
| 434463 ||  || — || August 26, 2005 || Palomar || NEAT || — || align=right | 2.2 km || 
|-id=464 bgcolor=#fefefe
| 434464 ||  || — || August 26, 2005 || Palomar || NEAT || — || align=right data-sort-value="0.75" | 750 m || 
|-id=465 bgcolor=#d6d6d6
| 434465 ||  || — || August 28, 2005 || Kitt Peak || Spacewatch || — || align=right | 2.9 km || 
|-id=466 bgcolor=#d6d6d6
| 434466 ||  || — || August 24, 2005 || Palomar || NEAT || — || align=right | 2.5 km || 
|-id=467 bgcolor=#fefefe
| 434467 ||  || — || August 28, 2005 || Kitt Peak || Spacewatch || — || align=right data-sort-value="0.57" | 570 m || 
|-id=468 bgcolor=#fefefe
| 434468 ||  || — || August 25, 2005 || Palomar || NEAT || — || align=right data-sort-value="0.75" | 750 m || 
|-id=469 bgcolor=#d6d6d6
| 434469 ||  || — || August 25, 2005 || Palomar || NEAT || THB || align=right | 3.1 km || 
|-id=470 bgcolor=#d6d6d6
| 434470 ||  || — || August 26, 2005 || Anderson Mesa || LONEOS || — || align=right | 3.3 km || 
|-id=471 bgcolor=#d6d6d6
| 434471 ||  || — || July 9, 2005 || Catalina || CSS || — || align=right | 2.9 km || 
|-id=472 bgcolor=#fefefe
| 434472 ||  || — || August 27, 2005 || Palomar || NEAT || — || align=right data-sort-value="0.71" | 710 m || 
|-id=473 bgcolor=#d6d6d6
| 434473 ||  || — || August 27, 2005 || Palomar || NEAT || — || align=right | 3.0 km || 
|-id=474 bgcolor=#d6d6d6
| 434474 ||  || — || August 28, 2005 || Kitt Peak || Spacewatch || THM || align=right | 2.4 km || 
|-id=475 bgcolor=#d6d6d6
| 434475 ||  || — || August 28, 2005 || Kitt Peak || Spacewatch || THM || align=right | 2.2 km || 
|-id=476 bgcolor=#d6d6d6
| 434476 ||  || — || August 28, 2005 || Kitt Peak || Spacewatch || — || align=right | 3.1 km || 
|-id=477 bgcolor=#fefefe
| 434477 ||  || — || August 27, 2005 || Palomar || NEAT || — || align=right data-sort-value="0.94" | 940 m || 
|-id=478 bgcolor=#fefefe
| 434478 ||  || — || August 27, 2005 || Palomar || NEAT || — || align=right data-sort-value="0.85" | 850 m || 
|-id=479 bgcolor=#FA8072
| 434479 ||  || — || August 27, 2005 || Palomar || NEAT || H || align=right data-sort-value="0.60" | 600 m || 
|-id=480 bgcolor=#fefefe
| 434480 ||  || — || August 31, 2005 || Kitt Peak || Spacewatch || MAS || align=right data-sort-value="0.75" | 750 m || 
|-id=481 bgcolor=#fefefe
| 434481 ||  || — || August 30, 2005 || Kitt Peak || Spacewatch || — || align=right data-sort-value="0.75" | 750 m || 
|-id=482 bgcolor=#d6d6d6
| 434482 ||  || — || September 1, 2005 || Palomar || NEAT || — || align=right | 5.8 km || 
|-id=483 bgcolor=#d6d6d6
| 434483 ||  || — || September 3, 2005 || Palomar || NEAT || — || align=right | 3.5 km || 
|-id=484 bgcolor=#fefefe
| 434484 ||  || — || September 10, 2005 || Anderson Mesa || LONEOS || — || align=right | 1.1 km || 
|-id=485 bgcolor=#fefefe
| 434485 ||  || — || September 1, 2005 || Kitt Peak || Spacewatch || — || align=right data-sort-value="0.71" | 710 m || 
|-id=486 bgcolor=#d6d6d6
| 434486 ||  || — || August 5, 2005 || Siding Spring || SSS || — || align=right | 3.0 km || 
|-id=487 bgcolor=#d6d6d6
| 434487 ||  || — || September 3, 2005 || Mauna Kea || C. Veillet || — || align=right | 3.0 km || 
|-id=488 bgcolor=#fefefe
| 434488 ||  || — || September 26, 2005 || Kitt Peak || Spacewatch || — || align=right data-sort-value="0.68" | 680 m || 
|-id=489 bgcolor=#fefefe
| 434489 ||  || — || September 26, 2005 || Kitt Peak || Spacewatch || — || align=right data-sort-value="0.75" | 750 m || 
|-id=490 bgcolor=#d6d6d6
| 434490 ||  || — || September 14, 2005 || Kitt Peak || Spacewatch || — || align=right | 3.2 km || 
|-id=491 bgcolor=#d6d6d6
| 434491 ||  || — || September 29, 2005 || Wrightwood || J. W. Young || — || align=right | 3.6 km || 
|-id=492 bgcolor=#fefefe
| 434492 ||  || — || September 23, 2005 || Kitt Peak || Spacewatch || — || align=right data-sort-value="0.78" | 780 m || 
|-id=493 bgcolor=#fefefe
| 434493 ||  || — || September 23, 2005 || Kitt Peak || Spacewatch || — || align=right data-sort-value="0.99" | 990 m || 
|-id=494 bgcolor=#fefefe
| 434494 ||  || — || September 23, 2005 || Kitt Peak || Spacewatch || NYScritical || align=right data-sort-value="0.55" | 550 m || 
|-id=495 bgcolor=#fefefe
| 434495 ||  || — || September 23, 2005 || Kitt Peak || Spacewatch || — || align=right data-sort-value="0.95" | 950 m || 
|-id=496 bgcolor=#fefefe
| 434496 ||  || — || September 13, 2005 || Socorro || LINEAR || NYS || align=right data-sort-value="0.68" | 680 m || 
|-id=497 bgcolor=#fefefe
| 434497 ||  || — || September 24, 2005 || Kitt Peak || Spacewatch || V || align=right data-sort-value="0.74" | 740 m || 
|-id=498 bgcolor=#fefefe
| 434498 ||  || — || September 25, 2005 || Kitt Peak || Spacewatch || MAS || align=right data-sort-value="0.85" | 850 m || 
|-id=499 bgcolor=#fefefe
| 434499 ||  || — || September 27, 2005 || Kitt Peak || Spacewatch || V || align=right data-sort-value="0.60" | 600 m || 
|-id=500 bgcolor=#FFC2E0
| 434500 ||  || — || September 30, 2005 || Catalina || CSS || APOcritical || align=right data-sort-value="0.20" | 200 m || 
|}

434501–434600 

|-bgcolor=#fefefe
| 434501 ||  || — || September 24, 2005 || Kitt Peak || Spacewatch || V || align=right data-sort-value="0.61" | 610 m || 
|-id=502 bgcolor=#d6d6d6
| 434502 ||  || — || September 24, 2005 || Kitt Peak || Spacewatch || — || align=right | 3.1 km || 
|-id=503 bgcolor=#fefefe
| 434503 ||  || — || September 24, 2005 || Kitt Peak || Spacewatch || — || align=right data-sort-value="0.68" | 680 m || 
|-id=504 bgcolor=#fefefe
| 434504 ||  || — || September 24, 2005 || Kitt Peak || Spacewatch || — || align=right data-sort-value="0.78" | 780 m || 
|-id=505 bgcolor=#fefefe
| 434505 ||  || — || September 24, 2005 || Kitt Peak || Spacewatch || — || align=right data-sort-value="0.81" | 810 m || 
|-id=506 bgcolor=#fefefe
| 434506 ||  || — || September 24, 2005 || Kitt Peak || Spacewatch || — || align=right data-sort-value="0.82" | 820 m || 
|-id=507 bgcolor=#fefefe
| 434507 ||  || — || September 24, 2005 || Kitt Peak || Spacewatch || NYS || align=right data-sort-value="0.61" | 610 m || 
|-id=508 bgcolor=#fefefe
| 434508 ||  || — || September 25, 2005 || Kitt Peak || Spacewatch || — || align=right data-sort-value="0.78" | 780 m || 
|-id=509 bgcolor=#fefefe
| 434509 ||  || — || September 27, 2005 || Kitt Peak || Spacewatch || — || align=right data-sort-value="0.75" | 750 m || 
|-id=510 bgcolor=#d6d6d6
| 434510 ||  || — || September 29, 2005 || Kitt Peak || Spacewatch || — || align=right | 2.5 km || 
|-id=511 bgcolor=#d6d6d6
| 434511 ||  || — || September 29, 2005 || Mount Lemmon || Mount Lemmon Survey || THM || align=right | 3.5 km || 
|-id=512 bgcolor=#fefefe
| 434512 ||  || — || September 29, 2005 || Kitt Peak || Spacewatch || — || align=right data-sort-value="0.75" | 750 m || 
|-id=513 bgcolor=#d6d6d6
| 434513 ||  || — || August 30, 2005 || Kitt Peak || Spacewatch || — || align=right | 1.7 km || 
|-id=514 bgcolor=#fefefe
| 434514 ||  || — || September 25, 2005 || Kitt Peak || Spacewatch || — || align=right data-sort-value="0.90" | 900 m || 
|-id=515 bgcolor=#fefefe
| 434515 ||  || — || September 25, 2005 || Kitt Peak || Spacewatch || — || align=right data-sort-value="0.94" | 940 m || 
|-id=516 bgcolor=#d6d6d6
| 434516 ||  || — || September 26, 2005 || Kitt Peak || Spacewatch || — || align=right | 4.3 km || 
|-id=517 bgcolor=#fefefe
| 434517 ||  || — || September 23, 2005 || Kitt Peak || Spacewatch || — || align=right data-sort-value="0.77" | 770 m || 
|-id=518 bgcolor=#fefefe
| 434518 ||  || — || August 31, 2005 || Anderson Mesa || LONEOS || — || align=right data-sort-value="0.98" | 980 m || 
|-id=519 bgcolor=#fefefe
| 434519 ||  || — || September 13, 2005 || Catalina || CSS || — || align=right | 1.1 km || 
|-id=520 bgcolor=#d6d6d6
| 434520 ||  || — || September 29, 2005 || Kitt Peak || Spacewatch || — || align=right | 3.5 km || 
|-id=521 bgcolor=#d6d6d6
| 434521 ||  || — || September 1, 2005 || Anderson Mesa || LONEOS || TIR || align=right | 3.4 km || 
|-id=522 bgcolor=#fefefe
| 434522 ||  || — || September 30, 2005 || Kitt Peak || Spacewatch || — || align=right data-sort-value="0.83" | 830 m || 
|-id=523 bgcolor=#d6d6d6
| 434523 ||  || — || September 30, 2005 || Mount Lemmon || Mount Lemmon Survey || — || align=right | 2.6 km || 
|-id=524 bgcolor=#fefefe
| 434524 ||  || — || September 30, 2005 || Anderson Mesa || LONEOS || V || align=right data-sort-value="0.70" | 700 m || 
|-id=525 bgcolor=#d6d6d6
| 434525 ||  || — || September 30, 2005 || Palomar || NEAT || Tj (2.98) || align=right | 6.0 km || 
|-id=526 bgcolor=#d6d6d6
| 434526 ||  || — || September 29, 2005 || Catalina || CSS || — || align=right | 3.5 km || 
|-id=527 bgcolor=#d6d6d6
| 434527 ||  || — || September 23, 2005 || Kitt Peak || Spacewatch || — || align=right | 3.5 km || 
|-id=528 bgcolor=#fefefe
| 434528 ||  || — || September 30, 2005 || Kitt Peak || Spacewatch || — || align=right data-sort-value="0.84" | 840 m || 
|-id=529 bgcolor=#fefefe
| 434529 ||  || — || September 23, 2005 || Catalina || CSS || MAS || align=right data-sort-value="0.69" | 690 m || 
|-id=530 bgcolor=#d6d6d6
| 434530 ||  || — || August 29, 2005 || Kitt Peak || Spacewatch || — || align=right | 3.1 km || 
|-id=531 bgcolor=#fefefe
| 434531 ||  || — || August 27, 2005 || Anderson Mesa || LONEOS || — || align=right data-sort-value="0.96" | 960 m || 
|-id=532 bgcolor=#fefefe
| 434532 ||  || — || August 26, 2005 || Anderson Mesa || LONEOS || — || align=right data-sort-value="0.77" | 770 m || 
|-id=533 bgcolor=#fefefe
| 434533 ||  || — || September 24, 2005 || Palomar || NEAT || — || align=right data-sort-value="0.75" | 750 m || 
|-id=534 bgcolor=#fefefe
| 434534 ||  || — || September 24, 2005 || Palomar || NEAT || NYS || align=right data-sort-value="0.69" | 690 m || 
|-id=535 bgcolor=#fefefe
| 434535 ||  || — || September 25, 2005 || Catalina || CSS || — || align=right data-sort-value="0.91" | 910 m || 
|-id=536 bgcolor=#fefefe
| 434536 ||  || — || September 29, 2005 || Kitt Peak || Spacewatch || — || align=right data-sort-value="0.85" | 850 m || 
|-id=537 bgcolor=#fefefe
| 434537 ||  || — || September 29, 2005 || Catalina || CSS || H || align=right data-sort-value="0.72" | 720 m || 
|-id=538 bgcolor=#fefefe
| 434538 ||  || — || September 26, 2005 || Catalina || CSS || H || align=right data-sort-value="0.58" | 580 m || 
|-id=539 bgcolor=#fefefe
| 434539 ||  || — || October 1, 2005 || Mount Lemmon || Mount Lemmon Survey || H || align=right data-sort-value="0.49" | 490 m || 
|-id=540 bgcolor=#d6d6d6
| 434540 ||  || — || October 1, 2005 || Catalina || CSS || — || align=right | 4.9 km || 
|-id=541 bgcolor=#d6d6d6
| 434541 ||  || — || October 1, 2005 || Kitt Peak || Spacewatch || — || align=right | 3.0 km || 
|-id=542 bgcolor=#fefefe
| 434542 ||  || — || October 1, 2005 || Socorro || LINEAR || — || align=right data-sort-value="0.82" | 820 m || 
|-id=543 bgcolor=#fefefe
| 434543 ||  || — || October 1, 2005 || Kitt Peak || Spacewatch || — || align=right data-sort-value="0.78" | 780 m || 
|-id=544 bgcolor=#fefefe
| 434544 ||  || — || October 1, 2005 || Mount Lemmon || Mount Lemmon Survey || V || align=right data-sort-value="0.60" | 600 m || 
|-id=545 bgcolor=#fefefe
| 434545 ||  || — || October 1, 2005 || Mount Lemmon || Mount Lemmon Survey || — || align=right data-sort-value="0.62" | 620 m || 
|-id=546 bgcolor=#fefefe
| 434546 ||  || — || October 4, 2005 || Mount Lemmon || Mount Lemmon Survey || — || align=right data-sort-value="0.71" | 710 m || 
|-id=547 bgcolor=#fefefe
| 434547 ||  || — || October 1, 2005 || Kitt Peak || Spacewatch || — || align=right data-sort-value="0.57" | 570 m || 
|-id=548 bgcolor=#fefefe
| 434548 ||  || — || September 24, 2005 || Kitt Peak || Spacewatch || — || align=right data-sort-value="0.77" | 770 m || 
|-id=549 bgcolor=#fefefe
| 434549 ||  || — || October 5, 2005 || Mount Lemmon || Mount Lemmon Survey || — || align=right data-sort-value="0.71" | 710 m || 
|-id=550 bgcolor=#fefefe
| 434550 ||  || — || September 25, 2005 || Kitt Peak || Spacewatch || — || align=right | 1.1 km || 
|-id=551 bgcolor=#fefefe
| 434551 ||  || — || October 6, 2005 || Mount Lemmon || Mount Lemmon Survey || — || align=right data-sort-value="0.75" | 750 m || 
|-id=552 bgcolor=#fefefe
| 434552 ||  || — || October 7, 2005 || Socorro || LINEAR || fast? || align=right | 1.1 km || 
|-id=553 bgcolor=#fefefe
| 434553 ||  || — || October 7, 2005 || Mount Lemmon || Mount Lemmon Survey || — || align=right data-sort-value="0.65" | 650 m || 
|-id=554 bgcolor=#fefefe
| 434554 ||  || — || October 7, 2005 || Kitt Peak || Spacewatch || — || align=right data-sort-value="0.94" | 940 m || 
|-id=555 bgcolor=#fefefe
| 434555 ||  || — || October 7, 2005 || Kitt Peak || Spacewatch || NYScritical || align=right data-sort-value="0.63" | 630 m || 
|-id=556 bgcolor=#fefefe
| 434556 ||  || — || September 29, 2005 || Mount Lemmon || Mount Lemmon Survey || MAS || align=right data-sort-value="0.86" | 860 m || 
|-id=557 bgcolor=#d6d6d6
| 434557 ||  || — || October 7, 2005 || Kitt Peak || Spacewatch || — || align=right | 2.2 km || 
|-id=558 bgcolor=#fefefe
| 434558 ||  || — || September 29, 2005 || Mount Lemmon || Mount Lemmon Survey || H || align=right data-sort-value="0.52" | 520 m || 
|-id=559 bgcolor=#d6d6d6
| 434559 ||  || — || October 8, 2005 || Kitt Peak || Spacewatch || THM || align=right | 2.7 km || 
|-id=560 bgcolor=#fefefe
| 434560 ||  || — || September 29, 2005 || Kitt Peak || Spacewatch || — || align=right data-sort-value="0.86" | 860 m || 
|-id=561 bgcolor=#fefefe
| 434561 ||  || — || September 29, 2005 || Kitt Peak || Spacewatch || — || align=right data-sort-value="0.86" | 860 m || 
|-id=562 bgcolor=#d6d6d6
| 434562 ||  || — || October 9, 2005 || Kitt Peak || Spacewatch || — || align=right | 2.9 km || 
|-id=563 bgcolor=#fefefe
| 434563 ||  || — || October 9, 2005 || Kitt Peak || Spacewatch || — || align=right data-sort-value="0.79" | 790 m || 
|-id=564 bgcolor=#fefefe
| 434564 ||  || — || October 9, 2005 || Kitt Peak || Spacewatch || — || align=right data-sort-value="0.73" | 730 m || 
|-id=565 bgcolor=#d6d6d6
| 434565 ||  || — || October 1, 2005 || Catalina || CSS || — || align=right | 4.0 km || 
|-id=566 bgcolor=#d6d6d6
| 434566 ||  || — || October 12, 2005 || Kitt Peak || Spacewatch || THM || align=right | 2.6 km || 
|-id=567 bgcolor=#fefefe
| 434567 ||  || — || October 5, 2005 || Catalina || CSS || H || align=right data-sort-value="0.49" | 490 m || 
|-id=568 bgcolor=#fefefe
| 434568 ||  || — || October 1, 2005 || Kitt Peak || Spacewatch || — || align=right data-sort-value="0.79" | 790 m || 
|-id=569 bgcolor=#d6d6d6
| 434569 ||  || — || October 22, 2005 || Palomar || NEAT || Tj (2.95) || align=right | 3.8 km || 
|-id=570 bgcolor=#fefefe
| 434570 ||  || — || October 27, 2005 || Kitt Peak || Spacewatch || H || align=right data-sort-value="0.64" | 640 m || 
|-id=571 bgcolor=#d6d6d6
| 434571 ||  || — || October 22, 2005 || Catalina || CSS || Tj (2.99) || align=right | 3.5 km || 
|-id=572 bgcolor=#fefefe
| 434572 ||  || — || October 22, 2005 || Catalina || CSS || — || align=right data-sort-value="0.84" | 840 m || 
|-id=573 bgcolor=#fefefe
| 434573 ||  || — || October 7, 2005 || Catalina || CSS || — || align=right data-sort-value="0.81" | 810 m || 
|-id=574 bgcolor=#fefefe
| 434574 ||  || — || October 24, 2005 || Kitt Peak || Spacewatch || NYS || align=right data-sort-value="0.64" | 640 m || 
|-id=575 bgcolor=#fefefe
| 434575 ||  || — || October 24, 2005 || Kitt Peak || Spacewatch || NYS || align=right data-sort-value="0.71" | 710 m || 
|-id=576 bgcolor=#fefefe
| 434576 ||  || — || October 23, 2005 || Catalina || CSS || — || align=right data-sort-value="0.97" | 970 m || 
|-id=577 bgcolor=#E9E9E9
| 434577 ||  || — || October 25, 2005 || Mount Lemmon || Mount Lemmon Survey || MAR || align=right data-sort-value="0.83" | 830 m || 
|-id=578 bgcolor=#d6d6d6
| 434578 ||  || — || October 24, 2005 || Palomar || NEAT || Tj (2.96) || align=right | 5.3 km || 
|-id=579 bgcolor=#fefefe
| 434579 ||  || — || October 22, 2005 || Kitt Peak || Spacewatch || MAS || align=right data-sort-value="0.62" | 620 m || 
|-id=580 bgcolor=#fefefe
| 434580 ||  || — || October 22, 2005 || Kitt Peak || Spacewatch || — || align=right data-sort-value="0.86" | 860 m || 
|-id=581 bgcolor=#E9E9E9
| 434581 ||  || — || October 22, 2005 || Kitt Peak || Spacewatch || — || align=right | 1.4 km || 
|-id=582 bgcolor=#fefefe
| 434582 ||  || — || October 24, 2005 || Kitt Peak || Spacewatch || V || align=right data-sort-value="0.54" | 540 m || 
|-id=583 bgcolor=#E9E9E9
| 434583 ||  || — || October 24, 2005 || Kitt Peak || Spacewatch || — || align=right data-sort-value="0.81" | 810 m || 
|-id=584 bgcolor=#fefefe
| 434584 ||  || — || October 26, 2005 || Kitt Peak || Spacewatch || — || align=right | 1.0 km || 
|-id=585 bgcolor=#fefefe
| 434585 ||  || — || October 26, 2005 || Kitt Peak || Spacewatch || H || align=right data-sort-value="0.62" | 620 m || 
|-id=586 bgcolor=#fefefe
| 434586 ||  || — || October 23, 2005 || Kitt Peak || Spacewatch || V || align=right data-sort-value="0.67" | 670 m || 
|-id=587 bgcolor=#fefefe
| 434587 ||  || — || October 24, 2005 || Kitt Peak || Spacewatch || — || align=right data-sort-value="0.78" | 780 m || 
|-id=588 bgcolor=#fefefe
| 434588 ||  || — || October 25, 2005 || Kitt Peak || Spacewatch || CLA || align=right | 1.5 km || 
|-id=589 bgcolor=#d6d6d6
| 434589 ||  || — || September 26, 2005 || Kitt Peak || Spacewatch || — || align=right | 2.8 km || 
|-id=590 bgcolor=#E9E9E9
| 434590 ||  || — || October 22, 2005 || Palomar || NEAT || — || align=right | 1.0 km || 
|-id=591 bgcolor=#fefefe
| 434591 ||  || — || October 25, 2005 || Kitt Peak || Spacewatch || — || align=right data-sort-value="0.94" | 940 m || 
|-id=592 bgcolor=#fefefe
| 434592 ||  || — || October 25, 2005 || Kitt Peak || Spacewatch || — || align=right data-sort-value="0.97" | 970 m || 
|-id=593 bgcolor=#fefefe
| 434593 ||  || — || October 25, 2005 || Kitt Peak || Spacewatch || — || align=right | 1.1 km || 
|-id=594 bgcolor=#fefefe
| 434594 ||  || — || October 25, 2005 || Kitt Peak || Spacewatch || CLA || align=right | 1.5 km || 
|-id=595 bgcolor=#fefefe
| 434595 ||  || — || October 25, 2005 || Kitt Peak || Spacewatch || — || align=right data-sort-value="0.78" | 780 m || 
|-id=596 bgcolor=#E9E9E9
| 434596 ||  || — || October 25, 2005 || Kitt Peak || Spacewatch || — || align=right data-sort-value="0.83" | 830 m || 
|-id=597 bgcolor=#fefefe
| 434597 ||  || — || October 28, 2005 || Mount Lemmon || Mount Lemmon Survey || — || align=right data-sort-value="0.92" | 920 m || 
|-id=598 bgcolor=#fefefe
| 434598 ||  || — || October 28, 2005 || Kitt Peak || Spacewatch || — || align=right data-sort-value="0.96" | 960 m || 
|-id=599 bgcolor=#fefefe
| 434599 ||  || — || October 24, 2005 || Kitt Peak || Spacewatch || MAS || align=right data-sort-value="0.69" | 690 m || 
|-id=600 bgcolor=#fefefe
| 434600 ||  || — || October 26, 2005 || Kitt Peak || Spacewatch || — || align=right data-sort-value="0.81" | 810 m || 
|}

434601–434700 

|-bgcolor=#E9E9E9
| 434601 ||  || — || October 26, 2005 || Kitt Peak || Spacewatch || — || align=right data-sort-value="0.71" | 710 m || 
|-id=602 bgcolor=#fefefe
| 434602 ||  || — || October 26, 2005 || Kitt Peak || Spacewatch || critical || align=right data-sort-value="0.78" | 780 m || 
|-id=603 bgcolor=#fefefe
| 434603 ||  || — || October 27, 2005 || Mount Lemmon || Mount Lemmon Survey || — || align=right data-sort-value="0.89" | 890 m || 
|-id=604 bgcolor=#fefefe
| 434604 ||  || — || October 27, 2005 || Catalina || CSS || H || align=right data-sort-value="0.57" | 570 m || 
|-id=605 bgcolor=#fefefe
| 434605 ||  || — || September 23, 2005 || Kitt Peak || Spacewatch || — || align=right data-sort-value="0.92" | 920 m || 
|-id=606 bgcolor=#fefefe
| 434606 ||  || — || September 23, 2005 || Kitt Peak || Spacewatch || — || align=right data-sort-value="0.86" | 860 m || 
|-id=607 bgcolor=#d6d6d6
| 434607 ||  || — || September 24, 2005 || Kitt Peak || Spacewatch || — || align=right | 2.8 km || 
|-id=608 bgcolor=#fefefe
| 434608 ||  || — || October 27, 2005 || Kitt Peak || Spacewatch || — || align=right data-sort-value="0.73" | 730 m || 
|-id=609 bgcolor=#fefefe
| 434609 ||  || — || October 27, 2005 || Kitt Peak || Spacewatch || — || align=right data-sort-value="0.86" | 860 m || 
|-id=610 bgcolor=#fefefe
| 434610 ||  || — || October 22, 2005 || Kitt Peak || Spacewatch || — || align=right data-sort-value="0.81" | 810 m || 
|-id=611 bgcolor=#d6d6d6
| 434611 ||  || — || October 30, 2005 || Kitt Peak || Spacewatch || 7:4 || align=right | 3.4 km || 
|-id=612 bgcolor=#d6d6d6
| 434612 ||  || — || October 8, 2005 || Catalina || CSS || — || align=right | 3.5 km || 
|-id=613 bgcolor=#fefefe
| 434613 ||  || — || October 25, 2005 || Mount Lemmon || Mount Lemmon Survey || — || align=right data-sort-value="0.99" | 990 m || 
|-id=614 bgcolor=#fefefe
| 434614 ||  || — || October 25, 2005 || Kitt Peak || Spacewatch || MAS || align=right data-sort-value="0.71" | 710 m || 
|-id=615 bgcolor=#d6d6d6
| 434615 ||  || — || October 30, 2005 || Kitt Peak || Spacewatch || — || align=right | 3.1 km || 
|-id=616 bgcolor=#fefefe
| 434616 ||  || — || October 30, 2005 || Kitt Peak || Spacewatch || — || align=right data-sort-value="0.98" | 980 m || 
|-id=617 bgcolor=#fefefe
| 434617 ||  || — || October 22, 2005 || Catalina || CSS || — || align=right | 1.0 km || 
|-id=618 bgcolor=#fefefe
| 434618 ||  || — || October 26, 2005 || Apache Point || A. C. Becker || — || align=right | 1.1 km || 
|-id=619 bgcolor=#fefefe
| 434619 ||  || — || October 27, 2005 || Anderson Mesa || LONEOS || — || align=right data-sort-value="0.93" | 930 m || 
|-id=620 bgcolor=#C7FF8F
| 434620 || 2005 VD || — || November 1, 2005 || Mount Lemmon || Mount Lemmon Survey || damocloidunusual || align=right | 6.0 km || 
|-id=621 bgcolor=#fefefe
| 434621 ||  || — || November 4, 2005 || Piszkéstető || K. Sárneczky || — || align=right data-sort-value="0.87" | 870 m || 
|-id=622 bgcolor=#fefefe
| 434622 ||  || — || November 8, 2005 || Socorro || LINEAR || — || align=right | 1.4 km || 
|-id=623 bgcolor=#d6d6d6
| 434623 ||  || — || November 3, 2005 || Catalina || CSS || — || align=right | 3.6 km || 
|-id=624 bgcolor=#fefefe
| 434624 ||  || — || October 24, 2005 || Kitt Peak || Spacewatch || NYS || align=right data-sort-value="0.59" | 590 m || 
|-id=625 bgcolor=#fefefe
| 434625 ||  || — || October 25, 2005 || Mount Lemmon || Mount Lemmon Survey || — || align=right data-sort-value="0.71" | 710 m || 
|-id=626 bgcolor=#fefefe
| 434626 ||  || — || November 4, 2005 || Kitt Peak || Spacewatch || NYS || align=right data-sort-value="0.77" | 770 m || 
|-id=627 bgcolor=#fefefe
| 434627 ||  || — || November 1, 2005 || Socorro || LINEAR || H || align=right data-sort-value="0.85" | 850 m || 
|-id=628 bgcolor=#E9E9E9
| 434628 ||  || — || November 1, 2005 || Mount Lemmon || Mount Lemmon Survey || — || align=right data-sort-value="0.81" | 810 m || 
|-id=629 bgcolor=#d6d6d6
| 434629 ||  || — || November 5, 2005 || Kitt Peak || Spacewatch || Tj (2.91) || align=right | 3.6 km || 
|-id=630 bgcolor=#fefefe
| 434630 ||  || — || October 29, 2005 || Kitt Peak || Spacewatch || NYS || align=right data-sort-value="0.52" | 520 m || 
|-id=631 bgcolor=#d6d6d6
| 434631 ||  || — || November 10, 2005 || Mount Lemmon || Mount Lemmon Survey || 7:4 || align=right | 3.9 km || 
|-id=632 bgcolor=#FFC2E0
| 434632 ||  || — || November 20, 2005 || Socorro || LINEAR || APO || align=right | 1.2 km || 
|-id=633 bgcolor=#FFC2E0
| 434633 ||  || — || November 21, 2005 || Kitt Peak || Spacewatch || APOPHAcritical || align=right data-sort-value="0.31" | 310 m || 
|-id=634 bgcolor=#E9E9E9
| 434634 ||  || — || November 25, 2005 || Mount Lemmon || Mount Lemmon Survey || EUN || align=right | 1.2 km || 
|-id=635 bgcolor=#E9E9E9
| 434635 ||  || — || November 21, 2005 || Catalina || CSS || — || align=right | 2.2 km || 
|-id=636 bgcolor=#fefefe
| 434636 ||  || — || November 29, 2005 || Junk Bond || D. Healy || — || align=right data-sort-value="0.89" | 890 m || 
|-id=637 bgcolor=#E9E9E9
| 434637 ||  || — || November 26, 2005 || Mount Lemmon || Mount Lemmon Survey || — || align=right | 1.6 km || 
|-id=638 bgcolor=#E9E9E9
| 434638 ||  || — || November 25, 2005 || Kitt Peak || Spacewatch || — || align=right data-sort-value="0.82" | 820 m || 
|-id=639 bgcolor=#fefefe
| 434639 ||  || — || September 30, 2005 || Mount Lemmon || Mount Lemmon Survey || NYS || align=right data-sort-value="0.58" | 580 m || 
|-id=640 bgcolor=#FA8072
| 434640 ||  || — || November 30, 2005 || Palomar || NEAT || — || align=right data-sort-value="0.82" | 820 m || 
|-id=641 bgcolor=#fefefe
| 434641 ||  || — || November 28, 2005 || Kitt Peak || Spacewatch || H || align=right data-sort-value="0.91" | 910 m || 
|-id=642 bgcolor=#E9E9E9
| 434642 ||  || — || November 29, 2005 || Mount Lemmon || Mount Lemmon Survey || — || align=right | 1.5 km || 
|-id=643 bgcolor=#fefefe
| 434643 ||  || — || December 1, 2005 || Socorro || LINEAR || V || align=right data-sort-value="0.83" | 830 m || 
|-id=644 bgcolor=#E9E9E9
| 434644 ||  || — || December 1, 2005 || Kitt Peak || Spacewatch || EUN || align=right | 1.1 km || 
|-id=645 bgcolor=#E9E9E9
| 434645 ||  || — || December 5, 2005 || Kitt Peak || Spacewatch || — || align=right data-sort-value="0.90" | 900 m || 
|-id=646 bgcolor=#E9E9E9
| 434646 ||  || — || November 26, 2005 || Kitt Peak || Spacewatch || — || align=right | 1.0 km || 
|-id=647 bgcolor=#d6d6d6
| 434647 ||  || — || December 1, 2005 || Kitt Peak || M. W. Buie || 7:4 || align=right | 3.0 km || 
|-id=648 bgcolor=#E9E9E9
| 434648 ||  || — || December 22, 2005 || Kitt Peak || Spacewatch || — || align=right | 1.2 km || 
|-id=649 bgcolor=#E9E9E9
| 434649 ||  || — || December 22, 2005 || Kitt Peak || Spacewatch || — || align=right data-sort-value="0.98" | 980 m || 
|-id=650 bgcolor=#fefefe
| 434650 ||  || — || December 22, 2005 || Kitt Peak || Spacewatch || — || align=right data-sort-value="0.88" | 880 m || 
|-id=651 bgcolor=#d6d6d6
| 434651 ||  || — || December 22, 2005 || Kitt Peak || Spacewatch || 7:4 || align=right | 3.2 km || 
|-id=652 bgcolor=#fefefe
| 434652 ||  || — || December 22, 2005 || Catalina || CSS || V || align=right data-sort-value="0.76" | 760 m || 
|-id=653 bgcolor=#E9E9E9
| 434653 ||  || — || December 24, 2005 || Kitt Peak || Spacewatch || — || align=right data-sort-value="0.99" | 990 m || 
|-id=654 bgcolor=#E9E9E9
| 434654 ||  || — || December 25, 2005 || Kitt Peak || Spacewatch || — || align=right data-sort-value="0.82" | 820 m || 
|-id=655 bgcolor=#E9E9E9
| 434655 ||  || — || December 25, 2005 || Mount Lemmon || Mount Lemmon Survey || — || align=right data-sort-value="0.92" | 920 m || 
|-id=656 bgcolor=#E9E9E9
| 434656 ||  || — || December 26, 2005 || Mount Lemmon || Mount Lemmon Survey || — || align=right | 1.2 km || 
|-id=657 bgcolor=#E9E9E9
| 434657 ||  || — || December 26, 2005 || Kitt Peak || Spacewatch || — || align=right data-sort-value="0.99" | 990 m || 
|-id=658 bgcolor=#E9E9E9
| 434658 ||  || — || December 25, 2005 || Kitt Peak || Spacewatch || — || align=right data-sort-value="0.78" | 780 m || 
|-id=659 bgcolor=#fefefe
| 434659 ||  || — || December 25, 2005 || Kitt Peak || Spacewatch || NYS || align=right data-sort-value="0.81" | 810 m || 
|-id=660 bgcolor=#E9E9E9
| 434660 ||  || — || December 25, 2005 || Kitt Peak || Spacewatch || (5) || align=right data-sort-value="0.73" | 730 m || 
|-id=661 bgcolor=#E9E9E9
| 434661 ||  || — || December 25, 2005 || Kitt Peak || Spacewatch || — || align=right | 1.2 km || 
|-id=662 bgcolor=#E9E9E9
| 434662 ||  || — || December 25, 2005 || Kitt Peak || Spacewatch || — || align=right | 1.7 km || 
|-id=663 bgcolor=#E9E9E9
| 434663 ||  || — || December 26, 2005 || Kitt Peak || Spacewatch || — || align=right | 1.7 km || 
|-id=664 bgcolor=#E9E9E9
| 434664 ||  || — || December 1, 2005 || Mount Lemmon || Mount Lemmon Survey || — || align=right | 1.2 km || 
|-id=665 bgcolor=#E9E9E9
| 434665 ||  || — || December 26, 2005 || Kitt Peak || Spacewatch || (5) || align=right data-sort-value="0.78" | 780 m || 
|-id=666 bgcolor=#E9E9E9
| 434666 ||  || — || December 24, 2005 || Socorro || LINEAR || — || align=right | 2.7 km || 
|-id=667 bgcolor=#fefefe
| 434667 ||  || — || December 10, 2005 || Kitt Peak || Spacewatch || — || align=right data-sort-value="0.94" | 940 m || 
|-id=668 bgcolor=#E9E9E9
| 434668 ||  || — || December 30, 2005 || Catalina || CSS || — || align=right | 2.2 km || 
|-id=669 bgcolor=#E9E9E9
| 434669 ||  || — || December 28, 2005 || Mount Lemmon || Mount Lemmon Survey || — || align=right | 1.4 km || 
|-id=670 bgcolor=#fefefe
| 434670 ||  || — || January 2, 2006 || Socorro || LINEAR || — || align=right data-sort-value="0.93" | 930 m || 
|-id=671 bgcolor=#E9E9E9
| 434671 ||  || — || January 2, 2006 || Socorro || LINEAR || — || align=right | 1.0 km || 
|-id=672 bgcolor=#E9E9E9
| 434672 ||  || — || January 4, 2006 || Kitt Peak || Spacewatch || (5) || align=right data-sort-value="0.75" | 750 m || 
|-id=673 bgcolor=#E9E9E9
| 434673 ||  || — || January 5, 2006 || Kitt Peak || Spacewatch || — || align=right data-sort-value="0.82" | 820 m || 
|-id=674 bgcolor=#E9E9E9
| 434674 ||  || — || December 28, 2005 || Kitt Peak || Spacewatch || (5) || align=right data-sort-value="0.78" | 780 m || 
|-id=675 bgcolor=#E9E9E9
| 434675 ||  || — || January 4, 2006 || Kitt Peak || Spacewatch || — || align=right data-sort-value="0.72" | 720 m || 
|-id=676 bgcolor=#E9E9E9
| 434676 ||  || — || January 6, 2006 || Kitt Peak || Spacewatch || MAR || align=right | 1.1 km || 
|-id=677 bgcolor=#FFC2E0
| 434677 ||  || — || January 23, 2006 || Catalina || CSS || APO +1kmPHA || align=right | 1.1 km || 
|-id=678 bgcolor=#E9E9E9
| 434678 ||  || — || January 22, 2006 || Nogales || J.-C. Merlin || (5) || align=right | 2.2 km || 
|-id=679 bgcolor=#E9E9E9
| 434679 ||  || — || January 22, 2006 || Mount Lemmon || Mount Lemmon Survey || — || align=right data-sort-value="0.73" | 730 m || 
|-id=680 bgcolor=#E9E9E9
| 434680 ||  || — || January 22, 2006 || Mount Lemmon || Mount Lemmon Survey || — || align=right | 1.2 km || 
|-id=681 bgcolor=#E9E9E9
| 434681 ||  || — || January 22, 2006 || Mount Lemmon || Mount Lemmon Survey || — || align=right | 1.6 km || 
|-id=682 bgcolor=#E9E9E9
| 434682 ||  || — || January 22, 2006 || Mount Lemmon || Mount Lemmon Survey || — || align=right data-sort-value="0.84" | 840 m || 
|-id=683 bgcolor=#E9E9E9
| 434683 ||  || — || January 20, 2006 || Catalina || CSS || — || align=right | 1.8 km || 
|-id=684 bgcolor=#E9E9E9
| 434684 ||  || — || January 23, 2006 || Nyukasa || Mount Nyukasa Stn. || — || align=right | 1.3 km || 
|-id=685 bgcolor=#E9E9E9
| 434685 ||  || — || January 19, 2006 || Catalina || CSS || — || align=right | 1.5 km || 
|-id=686 bgcolor=#E9E9E9
| 434686 ||  || — || January 20, 2006 || Kitt Peak || Spacewatch || — || align=right | 1.1 km || 
|-id=687 bgcolor=#E9E9E9
| 434687 ||  || — || January 25, 2006 || Kitt Peak || Spacewatch || — || align=right | 1.5 km || 
|-id=688 bgcolor=#E9E9E9
| 434688 ||  || — || January 25, 2006 || Kitt Peak || Spacewatch || — || align=right | 1.4 km || 
|-id=689 bgcolor=#E9E9E9
| 434689 ||  || — || January 23, 2006 || Kitt Peak || Spacewatch || — || align=right | 1.1 km || 
|-id=690 bgcolor=#E9E9E9
| 434690 ||  || — || January 23, 2006 || Kitt Peak || Spacewatch || — || align=right data-sort-value="0.94" | 940 m || 
|-id=691 bgcolor=#E9E9E9
| 434691 ||  || — || January 25, 2006 || Kitt Peak || Spacewatch || — || align=right | 2.3 km || 
|-id=692 bgcolor=#E9E9E9
| 434692 ||  || — || January 5, 2006 || Catalina || CSS || RAF || align=right | 1.1 km || 
|-id=693 bgcolor=#E9E9E9
| 434693 ||  || — || January 26, 2006 || Kitt Peak || Spacewatch || — || align=right | 1.2 km || 
|-id=694 bgcolor=#E9E9E9
| 434694 ||  || — || January 25, 2006 || Kitt Peak || Spacewatch || — || align=right | 1.3 km || 
|-id=695 bgcolor=#E9E9E9
| 434695 ||  || — || January 28, 2006 || Kitt Peak || Spacewatch || EUN || align=right | 1.4 km || 
|-id=696 bgcolor=#E9E9E9
| 434696 ||  || — || January 9, 2006 || Mount Lemmon || Mount Lemmon Survey || — || align=right | 2.0 km || 
|-id=697 bgcolor=#E9E9E9
| 434697 ||  || — || January 31, 2006 || Goodricke-Pigott || R. A. Tucker || (5) || align=right data-sort-value="0.96" | 960 m || 
|-id=698 bgcolor=#E9E9E9
| 434698 ||  || — || January 31, 2006 || Kitt Peak || Spacewatch || — || align=right | 1.7 km || 
|-id=699 bgcolor=#E9E9E9
| 434699 ||  || — || January 31, 2006 || Kitt Peak || Spacewatch || — || align=right | 2.4 km || 
|-id=700 bgcolor=#E9E9E9
| 434700 ||  || — || January 31, 2006 || Mount Lemmon || Mount Lemmon Survey || — || align=right | 2.6 km || 
|}

434701–434800 

|-bgcolor=#E9E9E9
| 434701 ||  || — || January 26, 2006 || Catalina || CSS || — || align=right | 1.8 km || 
|-id=702 bgcolor=#E9E9E9
| 434702 ||  || — || January 30, 2006 || Kitt Peak || Spacewatch || — || align=right | 1.4 km || 
|-id=703 bgcolor=#E9E9E9
| 434703 ||  || — || January 26, 2006 || Catalina || CSS || — || align=right | 2.1 km || 
|-id=704 bgcolor=#E9E9E9
| 434704 ||  || — || February 2, 2006 || Kitt Peak || Spacewatch || — || align=right | 1.7 km || 
|-id=705 bgcolor=#E9E9E9
| 434705 ||  || — || February 2, 2006 || Mount Lemmon || Mount Lemmon Survey || — || align=right data-sort-value="0.84" | 840 m || 
|-id=706 bgcolor=#E9E9E9
| 434706 ||  || — || February 2, 2006 || Kitt Peak || Spacewatch || — || align=right | 2.1 km || 
|-id=707 bgcolor=#d6d6d6
| 434707 ||  || — || November 29, 2005 || Mount Lemmon || Mount Lemmon Survey || Tj (2.94) || align=right | 6.4 km || 
|-id=708 bgcolor=#E9E9E9
| 434708 ||  || — || January 8, 2006 || Mount Lemmon || Mount Lemmon Survey || — || align=right | 1.3 km || 
|-id=709 bgcolor=#C2E0FF
| 434709 ||  || — || February 3, 2006 || Mauna Kea || P. A. Wiegert, A. Papadimos || res3:5critical || align=right | 132 km || 
|-id=710 bgcolor=#E9E9E9
| 434710 ||  || — || February 4, 2006 || Socorro || LINEAR || — || align=right | 2.1 km || 
|-id=711 bgcolor=#E9E9E9
| 434711 ||  || — || February 3, 2006 || Mount Lemmon || Mount Lemmon Survey || — || align=right | 1.5 km || 
|-id=712 bgcolor=#E9E9E9
| 434712 ||  || — || February 20, 2006 || Kitt Peak || Spacewatch || — || align=right | 1.6 km || 
|-id=713 bgcolor=#E9E9E9
| 434713 ||  || — || February 1, 2006 || Mount Lemmon || Mount Lemmon Survey || — || align=right | 1.3 km || 
|-id=714 bgcolor=#E9E9E9
| 434714 ||  || — || February 20, 2006 || Kitt Peak || Spacewatch || — || align=right | 1.4 km || 
|-id=715 bgcolor=#E9E9E9
| 434715 ||  || — || February 20, 2006 || Mount Lemmon || Mount Lemmon Survey || — || align=right | 2.2 km || 
|-id=716 bgcolor=#E9E9E9
| 434716 ||  || — || February 24, 2006 || Mount Lemmon || Mount Lemmon Survey || — || align=right | 1.7 km || 
|-id=717 bgcolor=#E9E9E9
| 434717 ||  || — || February 24, 2006 || Kitt Peak || Spacewatch || — || align=right | 1.4 km || 
|-id=718 bgcolor=#E9E9E9
| 434718 ||  || — || February 24, 2006 || Mount Lemmon || Mount Lemmon Survey || — || align=right | 2.8 km || 
|-id=719 bgcolor=#E9E9E9
| 434719 ||  || — || February 24, 2006 || Socorro || LINEAR || — || align=right | 1.7 km || 
|-id=720 bgcolor=#E9E9E9
| 434720 ||  || — || January 30, 2006 || Kitt Peak || Spacewatch || — || align=right data-sort-value="0.80" | 800 m || 
|-id=721 bgcolor=#E9E9E9
| 434721 ||  || — || February 25, 2006 || Kitt Peak || Spacewatch || — || align=right | 1.3 km || 
|-id=722 bgcolor=#E9E9E9
| 434722 ||  || — || February 25, 2006 || Mount Lemmon || Mount Lemmon Survey || — || align=right | 1.3 km || 
|-id=723 bgcolor=#E9E9E9
| 434723 ||  || — || February 27, 2006 || Kitt Peak || Spacewatch || — || align=right | 1.3 km || 
|-id=724 bgcolor=#E9E9E9
| 434724 ||  || — || January 10, 2006 || Mount Lemmon || Mount Lemmon Survey || — || align=right | 1.3 km || 
|-id=725 bgcolor=#E9E9E9
| 434725 ||  || — || February 27, 2006 || Mount Lemmon || Mount Lemmon Survey || — || align=right | 1.3 km || 
|-id=726 bgcolor=#E9E9E9
| 434726 ||  || — || February 27, 2006 || Kitt Peak || Spacewatch || JUN || align=right data-sort-value="0.99" | 990 m || 
|-id=727 bgcolor=#E9E9E9
| 434727 ||  || — || February 27, 2006 || Kitt Peak || Spacewatch || — || align=right | 1.2 km || 
|-id=728 bgcolor=#E9E9E9
| 434728 ||  || — || February 28, 2006 || Socorro || LINEAR || — || align=right | 1.9 km || 
|-id=729 bgcolor=#E9E9E9
| 434729 ||  || — || March 2, 2006 || Kitt Peak || Spacewatch || — || align=right | 1.4 km || 
|-id=730 bgcolor=#E9E9E9
| 434730 ||  || — || March 3, 2006 || Kitt Peak || Spacewatch || — || align=right | 1.3 km || 
|-id=731 bgcolor=#E9E9E9
| 434731 ||  || — || March 3, 2006 || Mount Lemmon || Mount Lemmon Survey || — || align=right | 1.4 km || 
|-id=732 bgcolor=#E9E9E9
| 434732 ||  || — || February 25, 2006 || Kitt Peak || Spacewatch || (5) || align=right data-sort-value="0.75" | 750 m || 
|-id=733 bgcolor=#E9E9E9
| 434733 ||  || — || March 3, 2006 || Kitt Peak || Spacewatch || — || align=right | 2.2 km || 
|-id=734 bgcolor=#FFC2E0
| 434734 ||  || — || March 24, 2006 || Catalina || CSS || APOPHA || align=right data-sort-value="0.36" | 360 m || 
|-id=735 bgcolor=#E9E9E9
| 434735 ||  || — || March 23, 2006 || Kitt Peak || Spacewatch || EUN || align=right | 1.1 km || 
|-id=736 bgcolor=#E9E9E9
| 434736 ||  || — || March 23, 2006 || Mount Lemmon || Mount Lemmon Survey || — || align=right | 2.0 km || 
|-id=737 bgcolor=#E9E9E9
| 434737 ||  || — || March 24, 2006 || Mount Lemmon || Mount Lemmon Survey || — || align=right | 1.0 km || 
|-id=738 bgcolor=#E9E9E9
| 434738 ||  || — || March 25, 2006 || Kitt Peak || Spacewatch || — || align=right | 2.9 km || 
|-id=739 bgcolor=#E9E9E9
| 434739 ||  || — || March 3, 2006 || Kitt Peak || Spacewatch || — || align=right | 1.3 km || 
|-id=740 bgcolor=#FFC2E0
| 434740 ||  || — || April 2, 2006 || Kitt Peak || Spacewatch || APOcritical || 1.0 km || 
|-id=741 bgcolor=#E9E9E9
| 434741 ||  || — || April 2, 2006 || Kitt Peak || Spacewatch || EUN || align=right | 1.1 km || 
|-id=742 bgcolor=#E9E9E9
| 434742 ||  || — || April 8, 2006 || Catalina || CSS || — || align=right | 1.5 km || 
|-id=743 bgcolor=#E9E9E9
| 434743 ||  || — || March 4, 2006 || Kitt Peak || Spacewatch || — || align=right | 1.6 km || 
|-id=744 bgcolor=#E9E9E9
| 434744 ||  || — || April 8, 2006 || Catalina || CSS || — || align=right | 1.9 km || 
|-id=745 bgcolor=#E9E9E9
| 434745 ||  || — || April 8, 2006 || Kitt Peak || Spacewatch || — || align=right | 2.1 km || 
|-id=746 bgcolor=#E9E9E9
| 434746 ||  || — || April 2, 2006 || Kitt Peak || Spacewatch || — || align=right | 1.6 km || 
|-id=747 bgcolor=#E9E9E9
| 434747 ||  || — || April 2, 2006 || Kitt Peak || Spacewatch || — || align=right | 2.3 km || 
|-id=748 bgcolor=#E9E9E9
| 434748 ||  || — || April 19, 2006 || Kitt Peak || Spacewatch || WIT || align=right | 1.4 km || 
|-id=749 bgcolor=#E9E9E9
| 434749 ||  || — || April 20, 2006 || Kitt Peak || Spacewatch || — || align=right | 2.2 km || 
|-id=750 bgcolor=#E9E9E9
| 434750 ||  || — || April 21, 2006 || Kitt Peak || Spacewatch || JUN || align=right | 1.1 km || 
|-id=751 bgcolor=#FFC2E0
| 434751 ||  || — || April 29, 2006 || Siding Spring || SSS || AMOcritical || align=right data-sort-value="0.71" | 710 m || 
|-id=752 bgcolor=#E9E9E9
| 434752 ||  || — || April 25, 2006 || Kitt Peak || Spacewatch || — || align=right | 1.7 km || 
|-id=753 bgcolor=#E9E9E9
| 434753 ||  || — || April 25, 2006 || Kitt Peak || Spacewatch || JUN || align=right data-sort-value="0.92" | 920 m || 
|-id=754 bgcolor=#E9E9E9
| 434754 ||  || — || January 14, 1996 || Kitt Peak || Spacewatch || — || align=right | 1.7 km || 
|-id=755 bgcolor=#E9E9E9
| 434755 ||  || — || April 26, 2006 || Kitt Peak || Spacewatch || — || align=right | 2.6 km || 
|-id=756 bgcolor=#E9E9E9
| 434756 ||  || — || April 26, 2006 || Kitt Peak || Spacewatch || — || align=right | 2.7 km || 
|-id=757 bgcolor=#E9E9E9
| 434757 ||  || — || April 29, 2006 || Kitt Peak || Spacewatch || DOR || align=right | 2.2 km || 
|-id=758 bgcolor=#E9E9E9
| 434758 ||  || — || April 30, 2006 || Kitt Peak || Spacewatch || — || align=right | 1.7 km || 
|-id=759 bgcolor=#E9E9E9
| 434759 ||  || — || April 30, 2006 || Kitt Peak || Spacewatch || — || align=right | 2.1 km || 
|-id=760 bgcolor=#E9E9E9
| 434760 ||  || — || March 25, 2006 || Kitt Peak || Spacewatch || — || align=right | 1.4 km || 
|-id=761 bgcolor=#E9E9E9
| 434761 ||  || — || April 26, 2006 || Kitt Peak || Spacewatch || critical || align=right | 1.6 km || 
|-id=762 bgcolor=#d6d6d6
| 434762 ||  || — || April 20, 2006 || Kitt Peak || Spacewatch || Tj (2.93) || align=right | 7.0 km || 
|-id=763 bgcolor=#E9E9E9
| 434763 ||  || — || April 30, 2006 || Catalina || CSS || — || align=right | 3.4 km || 
|-id=764 bgcolor=#E9E9E9
| 434764 ||  || — || May 2, 2006 || Nyukasa || Mount Nyukasa Stn. || — || align=right | 2.1 km || 
|-id=765 bgcolor=#E9E9E9
| 434765 ||  || — || May 1, 2006 || Kitt Peak || Spacewatch || — || align=right | 2.4 km || 
|-id=766 bgcolor=#E9E9E9
| 434766 ||  || — || May 3, 2006 || Kitt Peak || Spacewatch || — || align=right | 1.5 km || 
|-id=767 bgcolor=#E9E9E9
| 434767 ||  || — || May 4, 2006 || Mount Lemmon || Mount Lemmon Survey || AGN || align=right | 1.1 km || 
|-id=768 bgcolor=#E9E9E9
| 434768 ||  || — || May 4, 2006 || Kitt Peak || Spacewatch || — || align=right | 2.1 km || 
|-id=769 bgcolor=#E9E9E9
| 434769 ||  || — || February 2, 2006 || Kitt Peak || Spacewatch || — || align=right | 2.5 km || 
|-id=770 bgcolor=#E9E9E9
| 434770 ||  || — || May 20, 2006 || Kitt Peak || Spacewatch || — || align=right | 1.6 km || 
|-id=771 bgcolor=#E9E9E9
| 434771 ||  || — || May 19, 2006 || Palomar || NEAT || — || align=right | 2.3 km || 
|-id=772 bgcolor=#E9E9E9
| 434772 ||  || — || May 21, 2006 || Kitt Peak || Spacewatch || — || align=right | 1.9 km || 
|-id=773 bgcolor=#d6d6d6
| 434773 ||  || — || May 22, 2006 || Kitt Peak || Spacewatch || — || align=right | 2.8 km || 
|-id=774 bgcolor=#E9E9E9
| 434774 ||  || — || May 22, 2006 || Kitt Peak || Spacewatch || MRX || align=right data-sort-value="0.93" | 930 m || 
|-id=775 bgcolor=#E9E9E9
| 434775 ||  || — || May 20, 2006 || Kitt Peak || Spacewatch || — || align=right | 3.1 km || 
|-id=776 bgcolor=#E9E9E9
| 434776 ||  || — || May 21, 2006 || Catalina || CSS || — || align=right | 3.7 km || 
|-id=777 bgcolor=#E9E9E9
| 434777 ||  || — || May 23, 2006 || Kitt Peak || Spacewatch || — || align=right | 2.0 km || 
|-id=778 bgcolor=#E9E9E9
| 434778 ||  || — || October 21, 2003 || Kitt Peak || Spacewatch || — || align=right | 2.2 km || 
|-id=779 bgcolor=#E9E9E9
| 434779 ||  || — || May 24, 2006 || Kitt Peak || Spacewatch || — || align=right | 2.7 km || 
|-id=780 bgcolor=#E9E9E9
| 434780 ||  || — || May 31, 2006 || Mount Lemmon || Mount Lemmon Survey || — || align=right | 2.3 km || 
|-id=781 bgcolor=#E9E9E9
| 434781 ||  || — || May 29, 2006 || Socorro || LINEAR || — || align=right | 2.2 km || 
|-id=782 bgcolor=#E9E9E9
| 434782 ||  || — || June 18, 2006 || Kitt Peak || Spacewatch || — || align=right | 2.1 km || 
|-id=783 bgcolor=#FA8072
| 434783 ||  || — || June 21, 2006 || Catalina || CSS || — || align=right | 1.6 km || 
|-id=784 bgcolor=#fefefe
| 434784 ||  || — || May 30, 2006 || Mount Lemmon || Mount Lemmon Survey || — || align=right data-sort-value="0.56" | 560 m || 
|-id=785 bgcolor=#d6d6d6
| 434785 ||  || — || July 21, 2006 || Mount Lemmon || Mount Lemmon Survey || — || align=right | 2.5 km || 
|-id=786 bgcolor=#FFC2E0
| 434786 ||  || — || August 12, 2006 || Palomar || NEAT || APO +1km || align=right data-sort-value="0.81" | 810 m || 
|-id=787 bgcolor=#E9E9E9
| 434787 ||  || — || August 18, 2006 || Socorro || LINEAR || — || align=right | 2.3 km || 
|-id=788 bgcolor=#fefefe
| 434788 ||  || — || August 18, 2006 || Anderson Mesa || LONEOS || — || align=right data-sort-value="0.76" | 760 m || 
|-id=789 bgcolor=#d6d6d6
| 434789 ||  || — || August 21, 2006 || Kitt Peak || Spacewatch || KOR || align=right | 1.4 km || 
|-id=790 bgcolor=#d6d6d6
| 434790 ||  || — || August 21, 2006 || Kitt Peak || Spacewatch || — || align=right | 2.8 km || 
|-id=791 bgcolor=#fefefe
| 434791 ||  || — || August 19, 2006 || Kitt Peak || Spacewatch || — || align=right data-sort-value="0.59" | 590 m || 
|-id=792 bgcolor=#fefefe
| 434792 ||  || — || August 29, 2006 || Catalina || CSS || — || align=right data-sort-value="0.65" | 650 m || 
|-id=793 bgcolor=#d6d6d6
| 434793 ||  || — || August 29, 2006 || Catalina || CSS || — || align=right | 3.4 km || 
|-id=794 bgcolor=#fefefe
| 434794 ||  || — || July 25, 2006 || Mount Lemmon || Mount Lemmon Survey || — || align=right data-sort-value="0.72" | 720 m || 
|-id=795 bgcolor=#fefefe
| 434795 ||  || — || September 14, 2006 || Palomar || NEAT || — || align=right data-sort-value="0.69" | 690 m || 
|-id=796 bgcolor=#d6d6d6
| 434796 ||  || — || July 21, 2006 || Mount Lemmon || Mount Lemmon Survey || — || align=right | 3.1 km || 
|-id=797 bgcolor=#fefefe
| 434797 ||  || — || September 14, 2006 || Catalina || CSS || — || align=right data-sort-value="0.66" | 660 m || 
|-id=798 bgcolor=#d6d6d6
| 434798 ||  || — || September 14, 2006 || Kitt Peak || Spacewatch || — || align=right | 2.3 km || 
|-id=799 bgcolor=#d6d6d6
| 434799 ||  || — || September 14, 2006 || Kitt Peak || Spacewatch || — || align=right | 2.9 km || 
|-id=800 bgcolor=#fefefe
| 434800 ||  || — || September 14, 2006 || Kitt Peak || Spacewatch || — || align=right data-sort-value="0.65" | 650 m || 
|}

434801–434900 

|-bgcolor=#d6d6d6
| 434801 ||  || — || September 14, 2006 || Kitt Peak || Spacewatch || — || align=right | 2.5 km || 
|-id=802 bgcolor=#d6d6d6
| 434802 ||  || — || September 14, 2006 || Kitt Peak || Spacewatch || EOS || align=right | 1.7 km || 
|-id=803 bgcolor=#d6d6d6
| 434803 ||  || — || September 15, 2006 || Kitt Peak || Spacewatch || EOS || align=right | 2.0 km || 
|-id=804 bgcolor=#d6d6d6
| 434804 ||  || — || September 15, 2006 || Kitt Peak || Spacewatch || EOS || align=right | 2.3 km || 
|-id=805 bgcolor=#fefefe
| 434805 ||  || — || September 15, 2006 || Kitt Peak || Spacewatch || — || align=right data-sort-value="0.63" | 630 m || 
|-id=806 bgcolor=#d6d6d6
| 434806 ||  || — || September 15, 2006 || Kitt Peak || Spacewatch || EOS || align=right | 1.7 km || 
|-id=807 bgcolor=#fefefe
| 434807 ||  || — || September 15, 2006 || Kitt Peak || Spacewatch || — || align=right data-sort-value="0.52" | 520 m || 
|-id=808 bgcolor=#d6d6d6
| 434808 ||  || — || September 15, 2006 || Kitt Peak || Spacewatch || — || align=right | 3.0 km || 
|-id=809 bgcolor=#d6d6d6
| 434809 ||  || — || September 15, 2006 || Kitt Peak || Spacewatch || — || align=right | 2.3 km || 
|-id=810 bgcolor=#d6d6d6
| 434810 ||  || — || September 15, 2006 || Kitt Peak || Spacewatch || — || align=right | 2.8 km || 
|-id=811 bgcolor=#d6d6d6
| 434811 ||  || — || September 15, 2006 || Kitt Peak || Spacewatch || — || align=right | 2.7 km || 
|-id=812 bgcolor=#d6d6d6
| 434812 ||  || — || September 15, 2006 || Kitt Peak || Spacewatch || EOS || align=right | 2.2 km || 
|-id=813 bgcolor=#d6d6d6
| 434813 ||  || — || September 15, 2006 || Kitt Peak || Spacewatch || — || align=right | 2.9 km || 
|-id=814 bgcolor=#d6d6d6
| 434814 ||  || — || September 15, 2006 || Kitt Peak || Spacewatch || — || align=right | 3.0 km || 
|-id=815 bgcolor=#d6d6d6
| 434815 ||  || — || September 15, 2006 || Kitt Peak || Spacewatch || — || align=right | 2.3 km || 
|-id=816 bgcolor=#d6d6d6
| 434816 ||  || — || September 15, 2006 || Kitt Peak || Spacewatch || — || align=right | 3.6 km || 
|-id=817 bgcolor=#fefefe
| 434817 ||  || — || September 15, 2006 || Kitt Peak || Spacewatch || — || align=right data-sort-value="0.70" | 700 m || 
|-id=818 bgcolor=#d6d6d6
| 434818 ||  || — || September 15, 2006 || Kitt Peak || Spacewatch || — || align=right | 2.4 km || 
|-id=819 bgcolor=#d6d6d6
| 434819 ||  || — || September 15, 2006 || Kitt Peak || Spacewatch || — || align=right | 2.4 km || 
|-id=820 bgcolor=#fefefe
| 434820 ||  || — || September 15, 2006 || Kitt Peak || Spacewatch || NYS || align=right data-sort-value="0.50" | 500 m || 
|-id=821 bgcolor=#d6d6d6
| 434821 ||  || — || September 14, 2006 || Kitt Peak || Spacewatch || — || align=right | 2.5 km || 
|-id=822 bgcolor=#d6d6d6
| 434822 ||  || — || September 14, 2006 || Catalina || CSS || — || align=right | 3.3 km || 
|-id=823 bgcolor=#fefefe
| 434823 ||  || — || September 14, 2006 || Mauna Kea || J. Masiero || — || align=right data-sort-value="0.56" | 560 m || 
|-id=824 bgcolor=#fefefe
| 434824 ||  || — || September 15, 2006 || Kitt Peak || Spacewatch || — || align=right data-sort-value="0.65" | 650 m || 
|-id=825 bgcolor=#d6d6d6
| 434825 ||  || — || September 17, 2006 || Catalina || CSS || — || align=right | 2.8 km || 
|-id=826 bgcolor=#d6d6d6
| 434826 ||  || — || September 17, 2006 || Anderson Mesa || LONEOS || — || align=right | 3.7 km || 
|-id=827 bgcolor=#d6d6d6
| 434827 ||  || — || September 16, 2006 || Anderson Mesa || LONEOS || EOS || align=right | 2.1 km || 
|-id=828 bgcolor=#FA8072
| 434828 ||  || — || September 17, 2006 || Kitt Peak || Spacewatch || critical || align=right data-sort-value="0.49" | 490 m || 
|-id=829 bgcolor=#d6d6d6
| 434829 ||  || — || September 17, 2006 || Kitt Peak || Spacewatch || — || align=right | 2.4 km || 
|-id=830 bgcolor=#d6d6d6
| 434830 ||  || — || September 17, 2006 || Kitt Peak || Spacewatch || EOS || align=right | 1.6 km || 
|-id=831 bgcolor=#d6d6d6
| 434831 ||  || — || September 18, 2006 || Socorro || LINEAR || — || align=right | 3.5 km || 
|-id=832 bgcolor=#d6d6d6
| 434832 ||  || — || September 19, 2006 || Kitt Peak || Spacewatch || — || align=right | 3.4 km || 
|-id=833 bgcolor=#fefefe
| 434833 ||  || — || September 20, 2006 || Catalina || CSS || — || align=right data-sort-value="0.92" | 920 m || 
|-id=834 bgcolor=#FA8072
| 434834 ||  || — || September 20, 2006 || Catalina || CSS || — || align=right data-sort-value="0.68" | 680 m || 
|-id=835 bgcolor=#d6d6d6
| 434835 ||  || — || September 19, 2006 || Kitt Peak || Spacewatch || — || align=right | 2.7 km || 
|-id=836 bgcolor=#d6d6d6
| 434836 ||  || — || September 19, 2006 || Kitt Peak || Spacewatch || VER || align=right | 2.4 km || 
|-id=837 bgcolor=#d6d6d6
| 434837 ||  || — || September 18, 2006 || Kitt Peak || Spacewatch || THM || align=right | 2.4 km || 
|-id=838 bgcolor=#fefefe
| 434838 ||  || — || September 18, 2006 || Kitt Peak || Spacewatch || — || align=right data-sort-value="0.60" | 600 m || 
|-id=839 bgcolor=#d6d6d6
| 434839 ||  || — || September 18, 2006 || Kitt Peak || Spacewatch || — || align=right | 2.9 km || 
|-id=840 bgcolor=#d6d6d6
| 434840 ||  || — || September 18, 2006 || Kitt Peak || Spacewatch || — || align=right | 2.5 km || 
|-id=841 bgcolor=#d6d6d6
| 434841 ||  || — || September 19, 2006 || Kitt Peak || Spacewatch || — || align=right | 2.3 km || 
|-id=842 bgcolor=#d6d6d6
| 434842 ||  || — || July 22, 2006 || Mount Lemmon || Mount Lemmon Survey || — || align=right | 2.9 km || 
|-id=843 bgcolor=#d6d6d6
| 434843 ||  || — || September 19, 2006 || Catalina || CSS || — || align=right | 4.7 km || 
|-id=844 bgcolor=#fefefe
| 434844 ||  || — || September 16, 2006 || Anderson Mesa || LONEOS || — || align=right data-sort-value="0.65" | 650 m || 
|-id=845 bgcolor=#fefefe
| 434845 ||  || — || September 21, 2006 || Anderson Mesa || LONEOS || — || align=right data-sort-value="0.94" | 940 m || 
|-id=846 bgcolor=#fefefe
| 434846 ||  || — || September 25, 2006 || Anderson Mesa || LONEOS || — || align=right data-sort-value="0.83" | 830 m || 
|-id=847 bgcolor=#fefefe
| 434847 ||  || — || September 19, 2006 || Kitt Peak || Spacewatch || — || align=right data-sort-value="0.89" | 890 m || 
|-id=848 bgcolor=#d6d6d6
| 434848 ||  || — || September 19, 2006 || Kitt Peak || Spacewatch || — || align=right | 2.5 km || 
|-id=849 bgcolor=#d6d6d6
| 434849 ||  || — || September 19, 2006 || Kitt Peak || Spacewatch || — || align=right | 2.1 km || 
|-id=850 bgcolor=#d6d6d6
| 434850 ||  || — || September 23, 2006 || Kitt Peak || Spacewatch || — || align=right | 2.3 km || 
|-id=851 bgcolor=#d6d6d6
| 434851 ||  || — || July 22, 2006 || Mount Lemmon || Mount Lemmon Survey || — || align=right | 3.1 km || 
|-id=852 bgcolor=#d6d6d6
| 434852 ||  || — || September 25, 2006 || Kitt Peak || Spacewatch || — || align=right | 2.4 km || 
|-id=853 bgcolor=#d6d6d6
| 434853 ||  || — || September 25, 2006 || Kitt Peak || Spacewatch || EOS || align=right | 1.6 km || 
|-id=854 bgcolor=#d6d6d6
| 434854 ||  || — || September 15, 2006 || Kitt Peak || Spacewatch || — || align=right | 2.9 km || 
|-id=855 bgcolor=#d6d6d6
| 434855 ||  || — || September 16, 2006 || Kitt Peak || Spacewatch || EOS || align=right | 1.8 km || 
|-id=856 bgcolor=#d6d6d6
| 434856 ||  || — || September 25, 2006 || Mount Lemmon || Mount Lemmon Survey || — || align=right | 2.6 km || 
|-id=857 bgcolor=#d6d6d6
| 434857 ||  || — || September 19, 2006 || Anderson Mesa || LONEOS || — || align=right | 2.2 km || 
|-id=858 bgcolor=#d6d6d6
| 434858 ||  || — || September 27, 2006 || Mount Lemmon || Mount Lemmon Survey || — || align=right | 4.1 km || 
|-id=859 bgcolor=#d6d6d6
| 434859 ||  || — || September 25, 2006 || Mount Lemmon || Mount Lemmon Survey || — || align=right | 2.3 km || 
|-id=860 bgcolor=#d6d6d6
| 434860 ||  || — || September 26, 2006 || Kitt Peak || Spacewatch || EOS || align=right | 2.2 km || 
|-id=861 bgcolor=#d6d6d6
| 434861 ||  || — || September 26, 2006 || Kitt Peak || Spacewatch || — || align=right | 2.2 km || 
|-id=862 bgcolor=#d6d6d6
| 434862 ||  || — || September 26, 2006 || Kitt Peak || Spacewatch || — || align=right | 3.1 km || 
|-id=863 bgcolor=#fefefe
| 434863 ||  || — || April 6, 2005 || Kitt Peak || Spacewatch || — || align=right data-sort-value="0.89" | 890 m || 
|-id=864 bgcolor=#d6d6d6
| 434864 ||  || — || September 26, 2006 || Kitt Peak || Spacewatch || EOS || align=right | 1.9 km || 
|-id=865 bgcolor=#d6d6d6
| 434865 ||  || — || September 26, 2006 || Mount Lemmon || Mount Lemmon Survey || — || align=right | 4.1 km || 
|-id=866 bgcolor=#d6d6d6
| 434866 ||  || — || September 27, 2006 || Mount Lemmon || Mount Lemmon Survey || — || align=right | 3.3 km || 
|-id=867 bgcolor=#fefefe
| 434867 ||  || — || September 29, 2006 || Anderson Mesa || LONEOS || — || align=right data-sort-value="0.77" | 770 m || 
|-id=868 bgcolor=#d6d6d6
| 434868 ||  || — || September 14, 2006 || Catalina || CSS || EOS || align=right | 2.4 km || 
|-id=869 bgcolor=#d6d6d6
| 434869 ||  || — || September 25, 2006 || Kitt Peak || Spacewatch || EOS || align=right | 1.8 km || 
|-id=870 bgcolor=#d6d6d6
| 434870 ||  || — || September 27, 2006 || Mount Lemmon || Mount Lemmon Survey || EOS || align=right | 1.9 km || 
|-id=871 bgcolor=#d6d6d6
| 434871 ||  || — || September 27, 2006 || Kitt Peak || Spacewatch || — || align=right | 2.1 km || 
|-id=872 bgcolor=#d6d6d6
| 434872 ||  || — || September 27, 2006 || Kitt Peak || Spacewatch || — || align=right | 3.0 km || 
|-id=873 bgcolor=#d6d6d6
| 434873 ||  || — || October 20, 1995 || Kitt Peak || Spacewatch || EOS || align=right | 1.8 km || 
|-id=874 bgcolor=#fefefe
| 434874 ||  || — || September 19, 2006 || Kitt Peak || Spacewatch || — || align=right data-sort-value="0.72" | 720 m || 
|-id=875 bgcolor=#fefefe
| 434875 ||  || — || September 27, 2006 || Kitt Peak || Spacewatch || — || align=right data-sort-value="0.68" | 680 m || 
|-id=876 bgcolor=#d6d6d6
| 434876 ||  || — || September 28, 2006 || Kitt Peak || Spacewatch || EOS || align=right | 1.6 km || 
|-id=877 bgcolor=#d6d6d6
| 434877 ||  || — || September 28, 2006 || Kitt Peak || Spacewatch || — || align=right | 2.4 km || 
|-id=878 bgcolor=#d6d6d6
| 434878 ||  || — || September 28, 2006 || Kitt Peak || Spacewatch || — || align=right | 2.7 km || 
|-id=879 bgcolor=#fefefe
| 434879 ||  || — || September 28, 2006 || Kitt Peak || Spacewatch || — || align=right data-sort-value="0.70" | 700 m || 
|-id=880 bgcolor=#fefefe
| 434880 ||  || — || September 30, 2006 || Kitt Peak || Spacewatch || — || align=right data-sort-value="0.81" | 810 m || 
|-id=881 bgcolor=#fefefe
| 434881 ||  || — || August 29, 2006 || Kitt Peak || Spacewatch || — || align=right data-sort-value="0.75" | 750 m || 
|-id=882 bgcolor=#FA8072
| 434882 ||  || — || September 30, 2006 || Catalina || CSS || — || align=right data-sort-value="0.65" | 650 m || 
|-id=883 bgcolor=#d6d6d6
| 434883 ||  || — || September 30, 2006 || Mount Lemmon || Mount Lemmon Survey || EOS || align=right | 2.3 km || 
|-id=884 bgcolor=#d6d6d6
| 434884 ||  || — || September 30, 2006 || Mount Lemmon || Mount Lemmon Survey || VER || align=right | 2.8 km || 
|-id=885 bgcolor=#d6d6d6
| 434885 ||  || — || September 30, 2006 || Mount Lemmon || Mount Lemmon Survey || — || align=right | 3.8 km || 
|-id=886 bgcolor=#d6d6d6
| 434886 ||  || — || September 18, 2006 || Apache Point || A. C. Becker || — || align=right | 2.6 km || 
|-id=887 bgcolor=#d6d6d6
| 434887 ||  || — || September 18, 2006 || Apache Point || A. C. Becker || — || align=right | 2.8 km || 
|-id=888 bgcolor=#d6d6d6
| 434888 ||  || — || September 19, 2006 || Apache Point || A. C. Becker ||  || align=right | 2.4 km || 
|-id=889 bgcolor=#fefefe
| 434889 ||  || — || September 18, 2006 || Kitt Peak || Spacewatch || — || align=right data-sort-value="0.58" | 580 m || 
|-id=890 bgcolor=#d6d6d6
| 434890 ||  || — || September 25, 2006 || Mount Lemmon || Mount Lemmon Survey || VER || align=right | 2.3 km || 
|-id=891 bgcolor=#fefefe
| 434891 ||  || — || September 16, 2006 || Catalina || CSS || — || align=right data-sort-value="0.84" | 840 m || 
|-id=892 bgcolor=#d6d6d6
| 434892 ||  || — || September 25, 2006 || Kitt Peak || Spacewatch || — || align=right | 2.8 km || 
|-id=893 bgcolor=#d6d6d6
| 434893 ||  || — || September 19, 2006 || Kitt Peak || Spacewatch || — || align=right | 3.0 km || 
|-id=894 bgcolor=#d6d6d6
| 434894 ||  || — || September 30, 2006 || Mount Lemmon || Mount Lemmon Survey || — || align=right | 3.0 km || 
|-id=895 bgcolor=#fefefe
| 434895 ||  || — || September 19, 2006 || Kitt Peak || Spacewatch || — || align=right data-sort-value="0.67" | 670 m || 
|-id=896 bgcolor=#d6d6d6
| 434896 ||  || — || September 28, 2006 || Catalina || CSS || — || align=right | 3.8 km || 
|-id=897 bgcolor=#d6d6d6
| 434897 ||  || — || September 19, 2006 || Kitt Peak || Spacewatch || — || align=right | 2.6 km || 
|-id=898 bgcolor=#fefefe
| 434898 ||  || — || September 28, 2006 || Kitt Peak || Spacewatch || V || align=right data-sort-value="0.53" | 530 m || 
|-id=899 bgcolor=#fefefe
| 434899 ||  || — || September 28, 2006 || Catalina || CSS || — || align=right data-sort-value="0.74" | 740 m || 
|-id=900 bgcolor=#d6d6d6
| 434900 ||  || — || October 1, 2006 || Piszkéstető || K. Sárneczky || — || align=right | 2.6 km || 
|}

434901–435000 

|-bgcolor=#d6d6d6
| 434901 ||  || — || October 2, 2006 || Mount Lemmon || Mount Lemmon Survey || EOS || align=right | 2.0 km || 
|-id=902 bgcolor=#d6d6d6
| 434902 ||  || — || October 4, 2006 || Mount Lemmon || Mount Lemmon Survey || — || align=right | 3.6 km || 
|-id=903 bgcolor=#fefefe
| 434903 ||  || — || October 12, 2006 || Kitt Peak || Spacewatch || — || align=right data-sort-value="0.96" | 960 m || 
|-id=904 bgcolor=#d6d6d6
| 434904 ||  || — || October 12, 2006 || Kitt Peak || Spacewatch || VER || align=right | 2.4 km || 
|-id=905 bgcolor=#d6d6d6
| 434905 ||  || — || October 12, 2006 || Kitt Peak || Spacewatch || — || align=right | 2.8 km || 
|-id=906 bgcolor=#fefefe
| 434906 ||  || — || September 25, 2006 || Mount Lemmon || Mount Lemmon Survey || — || align=right data-sort-value="0.74" | 740 m || 
|-id=907 bgcolor=#d6d6d6
| 434907 ||  || — || October 12, 2006 || Kitt Peak || Spacewatch || — || align=right | 2.9 km || 
|-id=908 bgcolor=#d6d6d6
| 434908 ||  || — || October 12, 2006 || Kitt Peak || Spacewatch || — || align=right | 3.9 km || 
|-id=909 bgcolor=#d6d6d6
| 434909 ||  || — || October 12, 2006 || Kitt Peak || Spacewatch || — || align=right | 3.2 km || 
|-id=910 bgcolor=#fefefe
| 434910 ||  || — || October 12, 2006 || Kitt Peak || Spacewatch || — || align=right data-sort-value="0.72" | 720 m || 
|-id=911 bgcolor=#FA8072
| 434911 ||  || — || October 10, 2006 || Palomar || NEAT || — || align=right data-sort-value="0.83" | 830 m || 
|-id=912 bgcolor=#d6d6d6
| 434912 ||  || — || September 18, 2006 || Kitt Peak || Spacewatch || — || align=right | 3.2 km || 
|-id=913 bgcolor=#d6d6d6
| 434913 ||  || — || October 13, 2006 || Kitt Peak || Spacewatch || — || align=right | 4.2 km || 
|-id=914 bgcolor=#fefefe
| 434914 ||  || — || October 13, 2006 || Kitt Peak || Spacewatch || — || align=right data-sort-value="0.76" | 760 m || 
|-id=915 bgcolor=#d6d6d6
| 434915 ||  || — || October 13, 2006 || Kitt Peak || Spacewatch || TIR || align=right | 3.0 km || 
|-id=916 bgcolor=#fefefe
| 434916 ||  || — || October 13, 2006 || Kitt Peak || Spacewatch || — || align=right data-sort-value="0.79" | 790 m || 
|-id=917 bgcolor=#d6d6d6
| 434917 ||  || — || October 13, 2006 || Kitt Peak || Spacewatch || — || align=right | 4.0 km || 
|-id=918 bgcolor=#d6d6d6
| 434918 ||  || — || October 2, 2006 || Mount Lemmon || Mount Lemmon Survey || — || align=right | 2.5 km || 
|-id=919 bgcolor=#d6d6d6
| 434919 ||  || — || October 13, 2006 || Kitt Peak || Spacewatch || — || align=right | 2.8 km || 
|-id=920 bgcolor=#fefefe
| 434920 ||  || — || October 13, 2006 || Kitt Peak || Spacewatch || — || align=right data-sort-value="0.80" | 800 m || 
|-id=921 bgcolor=#d6d6d6
| 434921 ||  || — || October 15, 2006 || Lulin Observatory || C.-S. Lin, Q.-z. Ye || — || align=right | 4.3 km || 
|-id=922 bgcolor=#d6d6d6
| 434922 ||  || — || October 15, 2006 || Kitt Peak || Spacewatch || — || align=right | 4.3 km || 
|-id=923 bgcolor=#d6d6d6
| 434923 ||  || — || October 15, 2006 || Kitt Peak || Spacewatch || — || align=right | 4.7 km || 
|-id=924 bgcolor=#d6d6d6
| 434924 ||  || — || October 2, 2006 || Mount Lemmon || Mount Lemmon Survey || — || align=right | 3.2 km || 
|-id=925 bgcolor=#FA8072
| 434925 ||  || — || October 15, 2006 || Kitt Peak || Spacewatch || H || align=right data-sort-value="0.50" | 500 m || 
|-id=926 bgcolor=#d6d6d6
| 434926 ||  || — || October 15, 2006 || Kitt Peak || Spacewatch || — || align=right | 2.2 km || 
|-id=927 bgcolor=#d6d6d6
| 434927 ||  || — || October 2, 2006 || Mount Lemmon || Mount Lemmon Survey || — || align=right | 3.5 km || 
|-id=928 bgcolor=#d6d6d6
| 434928 ||  || — || October 1, 2006 || Apache Point || A. C. Becker || — || align=right | 2.3 km || 
|-id=929 bgcolor=#d6d6d6
| 434929 ||  || — || October 2, 2006 || Apache Point || A. C. Becker || — || align=right | 2.3 km || 
|-id=930 bgcolor=#d6d6d6
| 434930 ||  || — || October 3, 2006 || Apache Point || A. C. Becker || — || align=right | 2.6 km || 
|-id=931 bgcolor=#d6d6d6
| 434931 ||  || — || October 11, 2006 || Apache Point || A. C. Becker || EOS || align=right | 1.8 km || 
|-id=932 bgcolor=#d6d6d6
| 434932 ||  || — || October 11, 2006 || Apache Point || A. C. Becker || — || align=right | 2.5 km || 
|-id=933 bgcolor=#d6d6d6
| 434933 ||  || — || October 12, 2006 || Apache Point || A. C. Becker || EOS || align=right | 2.3 km || 
|-id=934 bgcolor=#d6d6d6
| 434934 ||  || — || October 12, 2006 || Apache Point || A. C. Becker || — || align=right | 2.9 km || 
|-id=935 bgcolor=#fefefe
| 434935 ||  || — || October 3, 2006 || Mount Lemmon || Mount Lemmon Survey || — || align=right data-sort-value="0.68" | 680 m || 
|-id=936 bgcolor=#fefefe
| 434936 ||  || — || October 4, 2006 || Mount Lemmon || Mount Lemmon Survey || — || align=right data-sort-value="0.90" | 900 m || 
|-id=937 bgcolor=#d6d6d6
| 434937 ||  || — || October 4, 2006 || Mount Lemmon || Mount Lemmon Survey || — || align=right | 4.3 km || 
|-id=938 bgcolor=#d6d6d6
| 434938 ||  || — || October 2, 2006 || Mount Lemmon || Mount Lemmon Survey || — || align=right | 3.1 km || 
|-id=939 bgcolor=#d6d6d6
| 434939 ||  || — || October 4, 2006 || Mount Lemmon || Mount Lemmon Survey || — || align=right | 2.7 km || 
|-id=940 bgcolor=#d6d6d6
| 434940 ||  || — || October 4, 2006 || Mount Lemmon || Mount Lemmon Survey || — || align=right | 3.2 km || 
|-id=941 bgcolor=#fefefe
| 434941 ||  || — || October 16, 2006 || Catalina || CSS || — || align=right data-sort-value="0.70" | 700 m || 
|-id=942 bgcolor=#d6d6d6
| 434942 ||  || — || October 16, 2006 || Kitt Peak || Spacewatch || THM || align=right | 2.5 km || 
|-id=943 bgcolor=#d6d6d6
| 434943 ||  || — || October 17, 2006 || Mount Lemmon || Mount Lemmon Survey || — || align=right | 2.9 km || 
|-id=944 bgcolor=#fefefe
| 434944 ||  || — || October 17, 2006 || Mount Lemmon || Mount Lemmon Survey || — || align=right data-sort-value="0.72" | 720 m || 
|-id=945 bgcolor=#d6d6d6
| 434945 ||  || — || September 30, 2006 || Mount Lemmon || Mount Lemmon Survey || — || align=right | 3.9 km || 
|-id=946 bgcolor=#d6d6d6
| 434946 ||  || — || October 16, 2006 || Kitt Peak || Spacewatch || — || align=right | 3.2 km || 
|-id=947 bgcolor=#fefefe
| 434947 ||  || — || October 16, 2006 || Kitt Peak || Spacewatch || — || align=right data-sort-value="0.62" | 620 m || 
|-id=948 bgcolor=#fefefe
| 434948 ||  || — || October 16, 2006 || Kitt Peak || Spacewatch || — || align=right data-sort-value="0.71" | 710 m || 
|-id=949 bgcolor=#fefefe
| 434949 ||  || — || September 27, 2006 || Mount Lemmon || Mount Lemmon Survey || — || align=right data-sort-value="0.76" | 760 m || 
|-id=950 bgcolor=#fefefe
| 434950 ||  || — || September 25, 2006 || Mount Lemmon || Mount Lemmon Survey || — || align=right data-sort-value="0.69" | 690 m || 
|-id=951 bgcolor=#d6d6d6
| 434951 ||  || — || September 25, 2006 || Mount Lemmon || Mount Lemmon Survey || — || align=right | 2.8 km || 
|-id=952 bgcolor=#d6d6d6
| 434952 ||  || — || October 16, 2006 || Kitt Peak || Spacewatch || EOS || align=right | 2.5 km || 
|-id=953 bgcolor=#d6d6d6
| 434953 ||  || — || September 28, 2006 || Mount Lemmon || Mount Lemmon Survey || — || align=right | 3.1 km || 
|-id=954 bgcolor=#d6d6d6
| 434954 ||  || — || September 28, 2006 || Mount Lemmon || Mount Lemmon Survey || URS || align=right | 3.7 km || 
|-id=955 bgcolor=#d6d6d6
| 434955 ||  || — || October 17, 2006 || Kitt Peak || Spacewatch || — || align=right | 4.1 km || 
|-id=956 bgcolor=#d6d6d6
| 434956 ||  || — || October 17, 2006 || Kitt Peak || Spacewatch || EOS || align=right | 1.8 km || 
|-id=957 bgcolor=#d6d6d6
| 434957 ||  || — || October 17, 2006 || Mount Lemmon || Mount Lemmon Survey || — || align=right | 3.0 km || 
|-id=958 bgcolor=#fefefe
| 434958 ||  || — || October 18, 2006 || Kitt Peak || Spacewatch || — || align=right data-sort-value="0.60" | 600 m || 
|-id=959 bgcolor=#fefefe
| 434959 ||  || — || October 16, 2006 || Catalina || CSS || — || align=right data-sort-value="0.87" | 870 m || 
|-id=960 bgcolor=#d6d6d6
| 434960 ||  || — || October 17, 2006 || Kitt Peak || Spacewatch || — || align=right | 3.0 km || 
|-id=961 bgcolor=#d6d6d6
| 434961 ||  || — || October 17, 2006 || Mount Lemmon || Mount Lemmon Survey || — || align=right | 3.6 km || 
|-id=962 bgcolor=#d6d6d6
| 434962 ||  || — || October 18, 2006 || Kitt Peak || Spacewatch || EOS || align=right | 2.1 km || 
|-id=963 bgcolor=#fefefe
| 434963 ||  || — || October 18, 2006 || Kitt Peak || Spacewatch || — || align=right data-sort-value="0.61" | 610 m || 
|-id=964 bgcolor=#fefefe
| 434964 ||  || — || October 18, 2006 || Kitt Peak || Spacewatch || — || align=right data-sort-value="0.63" | 630 m || 
|-id=965 bgcolor=#fefefe
| 434965 ||  || — || September 30, 2006 || Mount Lemmon || Mount Lemmon Survey || — || align=right data-sort-value="0.64" | 640 m || 
|-id=966 bgcolor=#fefefe
| 434966 ||  || — || October 18, 2006 || Kitt Peak || Spacewatch || — || align=right data-sort-value="0.68" | 680 m || 
|-id=967 bgcolor=#fefefe
| 434967 ||  || — || October 3, 2006 || Mount Lemmon || Mount Lemmon Survey || — || align=right data-sort-value="0.62" | 620 m || 
|-id=968 bgcolor=#fefefe
| 434968 ||  || — || October 18, 2006 || Kitt Peak || Spacewatch || — || align=right data-sort-value="0.59" | 590 m || 
|-id=969 bgcolor=#fefefe
| 434969 ||  || — || October 18, 2006 || Kitt Peak || Spacewatch || — || align=right data-sort-value="0.73" | 730 m || 
|-id=970 bgcolor=#d6d6d6
| 434970 ||  || — || September 27, 2006 || Catalina || CSS || — || align=right | 2.8 km || 
|-id=971 bgcolor=#d6d6d6
| 434971 ||  || — || September 25, 2006 || Kitt Peak || Spacewatch || — || align=right | 3.7 km || 
|-id=972 bgcolor=#d6d6d6
| 434972 ||  || — || September 26, 2006 || Mount Lemmon || Mount Lemmon Survey || — || align=right | 2.2 km || 
|-id=973 bgcolor=#d6d6d6
| 434973 ||  || — || October 19, 2006 || Kitt Peak || Spacewatch || — || align=right | 2.3 km || 
|-id=974 bgcolor=#d6d6d6
| 434974 ||  || — || October 19, 2006 || Kitt Peak || Spacewatch || — || align=right | 2.3 km || 
|-id=975 bgcolor=#d6d6d6
| 434975 ||  || — || October 19, 2006 || Kitt Peak || Spacewatch || — || align=right | 3.1 km || 
|-id=976 bgcolor=#fefefe
| 434976 ||  || — || September 30, 2006 || Mount Lemmon || Mount Lemmon Survey || — || align=right data-sort-value="0.53" | 530 m || 
|-id=977 bgcolor=#d6d6d6
| 434977 ||  || — || October 19, 2006 || Kitt Peak || Spacewatch || — || align=right | 2.3 km || 
|-id=978 bgcolor=#fefefe
| 434978 ||  || — || October 2, 2006 || Mount Lemmon || Mount Lemmon Survey || — || align=right data-sort-value="0.61" | 610 m || 
|-id=979 bgcolor=#d6d6d6
| 434979 ||  || — || October 19, 2006 || Kitt Peak || Spacewatch || — || align=right | 3.9 km || 
|-id=980 bgcolor=#fefefe
| 434980 ||  || — || October 19, 2006 || Kitt Peak || Spacewatch || — || align=right data-sort-value="0.81" | 810 m || 
|-id=981 bgcolor=#d6d6d6
| 434981 ||  || — || October 19, 2006 || Kitt Peak || Spacewatch || — || align=right | 3.5 km || 
|-id=982 bgcolor=#d6d6d6
| 434982 ||  || — || October 19, 2006 || Mount Lemmon || Mount Lemmon Survey || — || align=right | 2.9 km || 
|-id=983 bgcolor=#fefefe
| 434983 ||  || — || October 19, 2006 || Mount Lemmon || Mount Lemmon Survey || — || align=right data-sort-value="0.71" | 710 m || 
|-id=984 bgcolor=#d6d6d6
| 434984 ||  || — || October 19, 2006 || Kitt Peak || Spacewatch || — || align=right | 3.1 km || 
|-id=985 bgcolor=#d6d6d6
| 434985 ||  || — || October 19, 2006 || Mount Lemmon || Mount Lemmon Survey || — || align=right | 3.6 km || 
|-id=986 bgcolor=#fefefe
| 434986 ||  || — || October 19, 2006 || Kitt Peak || Spacewatch || — || align=right data-sort-value="0.85" | 850 m || 
|-id=987 bgcolor=#d6d6d6
| 434987 ||  || — || September 14, 2006 || Catalina || CSS || EOS || align=right | 2.1 km || 
|-id=988 bgcolor=#d6d6d6
| 434988 ||  || — || October 21, 2006 || Mount Lemmon || Mount Lemmon Survey || — || align=right | 4.1 km || 
|-id=989 bgcolor=#d6d6d6
| 434989 ||  || — || October 16, 2006 || Catalina || CSS || — || align=right | 4.8 km || 
|-id=990 bgcolor=#fefefe
| 434990 ||  || — || September 27, 2006 || Mount Lemmon || Mount Lemmon Survey || — || align=right data-sort-value="0.75" | 750 m || 
|-id=991 bgcolor=#d6d6d6
| 434991 ||  || — || October 23, 2006 || Kitt Peak || Spacewatch || ANF || align=right | 1.5 km || 
|-id=992 bgcolor=#d6d6d6
| 434992 ||  || — || October 23, 2006 || Kitt Peak || Spacewatch || — || align=right | 2.5 km || 
|-id=993 bgcolor=#d6d6d6
| 434993 ||  || — || October 23, 2006 || Kitt Peak || Spacewatch || — || align=right | 3.4 km || 
|-id=994 bgcolor=#d6d6d6
| 434994 ||  || — || September 26, 2006 || Mount Lemmon || Mount Lemmon Survey || — || align=right | 2.5 km || 
|-id=995 bgcolor=#fefefe
| 434995 ||  || — || July 21, 2006 || Mount Lemmon || Mount Lemmon Survey || — || align=right data-sort-value="0.68" | 680 m || 
|-id=996 bgcolor=#d6d6d6
| 434996 ||  || — || October 27, 2006 || Kitt Peak || Spacewatch || — || align=right | 3.7 km || 
|-id=997 bgcolor=#d6d6d6
| 434997 ||  || — || September 25, 2006 || Kitt Peak || Spacewatch || EOS || align=right | 1.7 km || 
|-id=998 bgcolor=#d6d6d6
| 434998 ||  || — || October 27, 2006 || Mount Lemmon || Mount Lemmon Survey || — || align=right | 3.1 km || 
|-id=999 bgcolor=#d6d6d6
| 434999 ||  || — || October 27, 2006 || Kitt Peak || Spacewatch || — || align=right | 2.9 km || 
|-id=000 bgcolor=#d6d6d6
| 435000 ||  || — || September 19, 2006 || Kitt Peak || Spacewatch || — || align=right | 2.1 km || 
|}

References

External links 
 Discovery Circumstances: Numbered Minor Planets (430001)–(435000) (IAU Minor Planet Center)

0434